

Deaths in January

 8: Thorbjørn Svenssen
 15: Nat Lofthouse
 20: Miesque

Current sporting seasons

American football 2011
National Football League
Playoffs
NCAA Division I FBS
NCAA Division I FCS

Basketball 2011
NBA

NCAA Division I men
NCAA Division I women
Euroleague
EuroLeague Women
Eurocup
EuroChallenge

France
Germany
Greece

Israel
Italy
Philippines
Philippine Cup

Russia
Spain
Turkey

Football (soccer) 2011
National teams competitions
UEFA Euro 2012 qualifying
2012 Africa Cup of Nations qualification
International clubs competitions
UEFA (Europe) Champions League
UEFA Europa League
UEFA Women's Champions League

CONCACAF (North & Central America) Champions League
OFC (Oceania) Champions League
Domestic (national) competitions

Australia

England
France
Germany
Iran
Italy

Scotland
Spain

Golf 2011
PGA Tour
European Tour

Champions Tour

Ice hockey 2011
National Hockey League
Kontinental Hockey League
Czech Extraliga
Elitserien
Canadian Hockey League:
OHL, QMJHL, WHL
NCAA Division I men
NCAA Division I women

Rugby union 2011
Heineken Cup
European Challenge Cup
English Premiership
Celtic League
LV Cup
Top 14

Sevens World Series

Snooker 2011
Players Tour Championship

Volleyball 2011

International clubs competitions
Men's CEV Champions League
Women's CEV Champions League
Domestic (national) competitions
Iranian Men's Super League

Winter sports
Alpine Skiing World Cup
Biathlon World Cup
Bobsleigh World Cup
Cross-Country Skiing World Cup

Freestyle Skiing World Cup
Luge World Cup
Nordic Combined World Cup
Short Track Speed Skating World Cup
Skeleton World Cup
Ski Jumping World Cup
Snowboard World Cup
Speed Skating World Cup

Days of the month

January 31, 2011 (Monday)

Alpine skiing
Women's World Cup in Sestriere, Italy:
Super combined: Cancelled due to heavy snow.

Cricket
West Indies in Sri Lanka:
1st ODI in Colombo:  245/5 (50 overs; Adrian Barath 113); . No result; 3-match series tied 0–0.

Football (soccer)
South American Youth Championship in Peru:
Final Group:
 1–0 
 0–1 
 1–5

January 30, 2011 (Sunday)

Alpine skiing
Men's World Cup in Chamonix, France:
Super combined:  Ivica Kostelić  2:57.12 (2:02.47 / 54.65)  Natko Zrnčić-Dim  2:57.63 (2:01.04 / 56.59)  Aksel Lund Svindal  2:57.65 (2:00.05 / 57.60)
Combined standings (after 3 of 4 races): (1) Kostelić 300 points (2) Silvan Zurbriggen  143 (3) Kjetil Jansrud  132
Kostelić wins his first combined title.
Overall standings (after 25 of 38 races): (1) Kostelić 1178 points (2) Zurbriggen 703 (3) Didier Cuche  673
Women's World Cup in Sestriere, Italy:
Downhill: Cancelled due to heavy snow.

American football
Pro Bowl in Honolulu, Hawaii:
NFC 55, AFC 41

Auto racing
Sports cars endurance racing:
24 Hours of Daytona in Daytona Beach, Florida, United States:
(1) Joey Hand , Scott Pruett , Graham Rahal  and Memo Rojas  (Chip Ganassi Racing Riley Mk. XI-BMW) 721 laps
(2) Scott Dixon , Dario Franchitti , Jamie McMurray  and Juan Pablo Montoya  (Chip Ganassi Racing Riley Mk. XI-BMW) 721 laps
(3) João Barbosa , Terry Borcheller , Christian Fittipaldi , J. C. France  and Max Papis  (Action Express Racing Riley Mk. XI-Porsche) 721 laps

Badminton
BWF Super Series:
Korea Open Super Series Premier in Seoul:
Men's singles: Lin Dan  def. Lee Chong Wei  21–19, 14–21, 21–16
Women's singles: Wang Yihan  def. Wang Shixian  21–14, 21–18
Men's doubles: Jung Jae-sung /Lee Yong-dae  def. Mathias Boe /Carsten Mogensen  21–6, 21–13
Women's doubles: Wang Xiaoli /Yu Yang  def. Tian Qing /Zhao Yunlei  21–18, 19–21, 21–4
Mixed doubles: Zhang Nan /Zhao Yunlei  def. Tao Jiaming/Tian Qing  21–17, 13–21, 21–19

Basketball
PBA Philippine Cup Finals (best-of-7 series):
Game 4 in Quezon City: San Miguel Beermen 91, Talk 'N Text Tropang Texters 87. Series tied 2–2.

Bobsleigh
World Cup in St. Moritz, Switzerland:
Four-man:  Edgars Maskalāns/Daumants Dreiškens/Ugis Zalims/Intars Dambis  2:09.34 (1:05.11 / 1:04.23)  Beat Hefti/Roman Handschin/Thomas Lamparter/Manuel Lüthi  2:09.36 (1:04.93 / 1:04.43)  Manuel Machata/Richard Adjei/Andreas Bredau/Christian Poser  2:09.50 (1:05.04 / 1:04.46)
Standings (after 7 of 8 races): (1) Machata 1461 points (2) Steve Holcomb  1346 (3) Karl Angerer  1266

Cricket
England in Australia:
5th ODI in Brisbane:  249 (49.3 overs; Chris Woakes 6/45);  198 (45.3 overs). Australia win by 51 runs; lead 7-match series 4–1.

Equestrianism
Show jumping:
FEI World Cup Western European League:
9th competition in Zurich (CSI 5*-W):  Marcus Ehning  on Küchengirl  Ben Maher  on Robin Hood W  Edwina Alexander  on Itot du Château
Standings (after 9 of 13 competitions): (1) Kevin Staut  87 points (2) Meredith Michaels-Beerbaum  62 (3) Rolf-Göran Bengtsson  58

Extreme sport
Winter X Games XV in Aspen, United States:
Men's:
Skier X:  John Teller  1:21.167  Christopher Del Bosco  1:21.197  Casey Puckett  1:21.979
SnoCross Adaptive:  Mike Schultz  5:11.704  Jeff Tweet  5:53.741  Jim Wazny  5:55.078
SnoCross:  Tucker Hibbert   Ross Martin   Robbie Malinoski 
Snowboard Slopestyle:  Sebastien Toutant  93.00 points  Mark McMorris  90.00  Tyler Flanagan  82.66
Mono Skier X:  Josh Dueck  1:59.656  Brandon Adam  2:10.471  Sean Rose  2:18.684
Snowmobile Best Trick:  Daniel Bodin  96.00 points  Caleb Moore  90.33  Heath Frisby  86.00
Snowboard SuperPipe:  Shaun White  97.33 points  Scotty Lago  92.00  Louie Vito  87.33
White wins the gold for the fourth successive year, and the sixth time overall.
Women's:
Snowboard Slopestyle:  Enni Rukajärvi  92.66 points  Jenny Jones  89.33  Jamie Anderson  86.00
Skier X:  Kelsey Serwa  1:28.830  Ophélie David  1:29.162  Fanny Smith  1:29.367
David fails to win the event for the first time since 2006.

Golf
PGA Tour:
Farmers Insurance Open in La Jolla, California:
Winner: Bubba Watson  272 (−16)
Watson wins his second PGA Tour title.
European Tour:
Volvo Golf Champions in Bahrain:
Winner: Paul Casey  268 (−20)
Casey wins his eleventh European Tour title.

Handball
World Men's Championship in Sweden:
Third place match:  23–24  
Final:   37–35 (ET)  
France defend their title, and win the championship for a record-equalling fourth time. They also qualify for the 2012 Olympic tournament.

Ice hockey
NHL All-Star Game in Raleigh, North Carolina:
Team Lidström 11, Team Staal 10

Luge
FIL World Natural Track Championships in Umhausen, Austria:
Men's singles:  Gerald Kammerlander  3:37.61 (1:12.46 / 1:12.48 / 1:12.67)  Robert Batkowski  3:37.65 (1:12.97 / 1:12.12 / 1:12.56)  Patrick Pigneter  3:37.95 (1:12.72 / 1:11.99 / 1:13.24)
Kammerlander wins his first world title.
Women's singles:  Renate Gietl  3:40.43 (1:13.48 / 1:13.61 / 1:13.34)  Yekaterina Lavrentyeva  3:40.67 (1:13.43 / 1:13.90 / 1:13.34)  Melanie Schwarz  3:43.31 (1:14.50 / 1:14.62 / 1:14.19)
Gietl wins her second consecutive world title.
FIL World Championships in Cesana, Italy:
Men's doubles:  Andreas Linger/Wolfgang Linger  1:33.280 (46.668 / 46.612)  Christian Oberstolz/Patrick Gruber  1:33.512 (46.752 / 46.760)  Andris Šics/Juris Šics  1:33.728 (46.909 / 46.719)
The Lingers win their second world title.
Mixed team relay: Cancelled due to technical difficulties.

Ski jumping
World Cup in Willingen, Germany:
HS 145:  Severin Freund  289.1 points  Martin Koch  286.9  Simon Ammann  284.5
Standings (after 19 of 26 events): (1) Thomas Morgenstern  1434 points (2) Ammann 1013 (3) Andreas Kofler  930

Snooker
Shoot-Out in Blackpool, England:
Final: Nigel Bond  58–24 Robert Milkins 
Bond wins his fifth professional title.

Speed skating
World Cup 6 in Moscow, Russia:
Men's:
1000m:  Stefan Groothuis  1:08.82  Denny Morrison  1:09.57  Mikael Flygind Larsen  1:09.65
Standings (after 7 of 8 races): (1) Groothuis 430 points (2) Lee Kyou-hyuk  402 (3) Shani Davis  380
Team Pursuit:   3:43.71   3:46.68   3:47.15
Final standings: (1) Norway 270 points (2) Russia 250 (3)  232
Women's:
1000m:  Christine Nesbitt  1:15.59  Ireen Wüst  1:15.94  Heather Richardson  1:16.18
Standings (after 7 of 8 races): (1) Richardson 560 points (2) Nesbitt 500 (3) Nao Kodaira  339
Team Pursuit:   3:01.13   3:03.02   3:04.11
Final standings: (1) Netherlands 300 points (2) Germany & Norway 250

Tennis
Australian Open in Melbourne, Australia, day 14:
Men's Singles – Final: Novak Djokovic  [3] vs. Andy Murray  [5] 6–4, 6–2, 6–3
Djokovic wins his second Australian Open and Grand Slam singles title.
Mixed Doubles – Final: Katarina Srebotnik /Daniel Nestor  def. Chan Yung-jan /Paul Hanley  6–3, 3–6, [10–7]
Srebotnik and Nestor win their first Grand Slam title together. Srebotnik wins her first Australian Open, and her fifth Grand Slam mixed doubles title. Nestor wins his second Australian Open and Grand Slam mixed doubles title.

January 29, 2011 (Saturday)

Alpine skiing
Men's World Cup in Chamonix, France:
Downhill:  Didier Cuche  1:58.91  Dominik Paris  1:59.58  Klaus Kröll  1:59.79
Downhill standings (after 6 of 9 races): (1) Cuche 379 points (2) Michael Walchhofer  314 (3) Silvan Zurbriggen  285
Overall standings (after 24 of 38 races): (1) Ivica Kostelić  1078 points (2) Cuche 673 (3) Zurbriggen 658
Women's World Cup in Sestriere, Italy:
Downhill: Cancelled due to fog.

Bobsleigh
World Cup in St. Moritz, Switzerland:
Two-man:  Manuel Machata/Andreas Bredau  2:12.27 (1:06.36 / 1:05.91)  Beat Hefti/Thomas Lamparter  2:12.30 (1:06.42 / 1:05.88)  Thomas Florschütz/Kevin Kuske  2:12.66 (1:06.58 / 1:06.08)
Standings (after 7 of 8 races): (1) Alexandr Zubkov  1430 points (2) Machata 1412 (3) Simone Bertazzo  1251
Two-women:  Sandra Kiriasis/Berit Wiacker  2:14.89 (1:07.57 / 1:07.32)  Anja Schneiderheinze-Stöckel/Christin Senkel  2:15.17 (1:07.76 / 1:07.41)  Cathleen Martini/Romy Logsch  2:15.54 (1:07.71 / 1:07.83)
Standings (after 7 of 8 races): (1) Kiriasis 1511 points (2) Martini 1387 (3) Kaillie Humphries  1216

Cricket
Pakistan in New Zealand:
3rd ODI in Christchurch:  293/7 (50 overs; Mohammad Hafeez 115);  250/9 (50 overs). Pakistan win by 43 runs; 6-match series tied 1–1.

Extreme sport
Winter X Games XV in Aspen, United States:
Men's:
Snowboarder-X:  Nick Baumgartner  1:29.700  Kevin Hill  1:29.856  Nate Holland  1:30.026
Holland fails to win the event for the first time since 2005.
Slopestyle skiing:  Sammy Carlson  93.33 points  Russ Henshaw  90.66  Andreas Håtveit  90.00
Snowboard Street:  Nic Sauve  85 points  Louis-Felix Paradis  68  Simon Chamberlain  64
Skiing Big Air:  Alex Schlopy  92 points  Bobby Brown  89  Sammy Carlson  87
Schlopy wins the event for the second successive year.
Women's:
Snowboarder-X:  Lindsey Jacobellis  1:38.943  Callan Chythlook-Sifsof  1:39.681  Déborah Anthonioz  1:40.026
Jacobellis wins for the fourth consecutive year, and the seventh time in nine years.
Snowboard SuperPipe:  Kelly Clark  92.33 points  Kaitlyn Farrington  85.66  Elena Hight  80.00
Clark wins the event for the second time.

Figure skating
European Championships in Bern, Switzerland:
Ladies:  Sarah Meier  170.60 points  Carolina Kostner  168.54  Kiira Korpi  166.40
Meier becomes the first Swiss woman to win the championship since Denise Biellmann in 1981.
Men:  Florent Amodio  226.86 points  Brian Joubert  223.01  Tomáš Verner  222.60
Amodio wins the title for the first time. He and Joubert become the first French pair since Alain Giletti and Alain Calmat in 1961 to finish in the top two places.

Football (soccer)
AFC Asian Cup in Qatar:
Final:   0–1 (a.e.t.)  
Japan win the Cup for a record fourth time.

Freestyle skiing
World Cup in Grasgehren, Germany:
Men's Ski Cross:  Andreas Matt   Patrick Koller   Armin Niederer 
Ski Cross standings (after 6 of 11 events): (1) Matt 419 points (2) Christopher Del Bosco  225 (3) Alex Fiva  199
Women's Ski Cross:  Anna Holmlund   Heidi Zacher   Katrin Müller 
Ski Cross standings (after 6 of 11 events): (1) Zacher 376 points (2) Holmlund 332 (3) Kelsey Serwa  329
World Cup in Calgary, Canada:
Men's Moguls:  Mikaël Kingsbury  24.25 points  Alexandre Bilodeau  24.16  Alexandr Smyshlyaev  23.53
Moguls standings (after 7 of 11 events): (1) Guilbaut Colas  536 points (2) Kingsbury 455 (3) Bilodeau 379
Women's Moguls:  Hannah Kearney  24.43 points  Audrey Robichaud  22.71  Ekaterina Stolyarova  22.59
Moguls standings (after 7 of 11 events): (1) Kearney 609 points (2) Jennifer Heil  412 (3) Robichaud 300
Men's Aerials:  Warren Shouldice  244.90 points  Renato Ulrich  243.01  Scotty Bahrke  229.57
Aerials standings (after 5 of 8 events): (1) Qi Guangpu  361 points (2) Jia Zongyang  238 (3) Ulrich 231
Overall standings: (1) Guilbaut Colas  77 points (2) Qi 72 (3) Andreas Matt  70
Women's Aerials:  Cheng Shuang  187.23 points  Xu Mengtao  186.65  Olha Volkova  175.40
Aerials standings (after 5 of 8 events): (1) Xu 420 points (2) Cheng 316 (3) Volkova 213
Overall standings: (1) Hannah Kearney  87 points (2) Xu 84 (3) Cheng & Heidi Zacher  63

Luge
FIL World Natural Track Championships in Umhausen, Austria:
Men's doubles:  Pavel Porzhnev/Ivan Lazarev  2:33.24 (1:16.71 / 1:16.53)  Patrick Pigneter/Florian Clara  2:33.90 (1:17.56 / 1:16.34)  Andrzej Laszczak/Damian Waniczek  2:35.26 (1:17.99 / 1:17.27)
Porzhnev and Lazarev win their third world title.
FIL World Championships in Cesana, Italy:
Men's singles:  Armin Zöggeler  1:43.538 (51.568 / 51.970)  Felix Loch  1:43.559 (51.511 / 52.048)  Andi Langenhan  1:44.013 (51.827 / 52.186)
Zöggeler wins his sixth world title.
Women's singles:  Tatjana Hüfner  1:33.969 (46.976 / 46.993)  Natalie Geisenberger  1:34.243 (47.027 / 47.216)  Alex Gough  1:34.413 (47.051 / 47.362)
Hüfner wins her third world title. Gough wins the first ever world championship medal for women from Canada.

Mixed martial arts
Strikeforce: Diaz vs. Cyborg in San Jose, California, United States:
Light Heavyweight bout: Roger Gracie  def. Trevor Prangley  by submission (rear naked choke)
Heavyweight bout: Herschel Walker  def. Scott Carson  by TKO (strikes)
Middleweight Championship bout: Ronaldo Souza  (c) def. Robbie Lawler  by submission (rear naked choke)
Welterweight Championship bout: Nick Diaz  (c) def. Evangelista Santos  by submission (armbar)

Ski jumping
World Cup in Willingen, Germany:
HS 145 Team:   (Gregor Schlierenzauer, Martin Koch, Andreas Kofler, Thomas Morgenstern) 1071.8 points   (Michael Uhrmann, Martin Schmitt, Michael Neumayer, Severin Freund) 1025.1   (Kamil Stoch, Piotr Żyła, Stefan Hula, Adam Małysz) 1015.7

Speed skating
World Cup 6 in Moscow, Russia:
Men's:
500m:  Jan Smeekens  34.93  Akio Ota  35.02  Tucker Fredricks  35.06
Standings (after 10 of 12 races): (1) Joji Kato  615 points (2) Lee Kang-seok  590 (3) Fredricks 540
5000m:  Bob de Jong  6:19.43  Ivan Skobrev  6:21.16  Håvard Bøkko  6:22.79
Standings (after 4 of 6 races): (1) de Jong 360 points (2) Skobrev 280 (3) Bøkko 236
Women's:
500m:  Jenny Wolf  38.01  Margot Boer  38.49  Heather Richardson  38.53(3)
Standings (after 10 of 12 races): (1) Wolf 920 points (2) Lee Sang-hwa  650 (3) Boer 570
1500m:  Christine Nesbitt  1:56.80  Ireen Wüst  1:56.93  Martina Sáblíková  1:57.50
Standings (after 4 of 6 races): (1) Nesbitt 400 points (2) Marrit Leenstra  246 (3) Wüst 230

Tennis
Australian Open in Melbourne, Australia, day 13:
Women's Singles – Final: Kim Clijsters  def. Li Na  3–6, 6–3, 6–3
Clijsters wins her first Australian Open title, and her fourth Grand Slam singles title.
Men's Doubles – Final: Bob Bryan  / Mike Bryan  def. Mahesh Bhupathi  / Leander Paes  6–3, 6–4
The Bryans win the Australian Open men's doubles title for the third consecutive time and fifth time in six years, and their 10th Grand Slam men's doubles title.
Boys' Singles – Final: Jiří Veselý  def. Luke Saville  6–0, 6–3
Girls' Singles – Final: An-Sophie Mestach  def. Monica Puig  6–4, 6–2
Wheelchair Men's Singles – Final: Shingo Kunieda  def. Stéphane Houdet  6–0, 6–3
Kuneida wins his fifth successive Australian Open title, the seventh successive Grand Slam title and the 12th Grand Slam title overall.
Wheelchair Women's Singles – Final: Esther Vergeer  def. Daniela di Toro  6–0, 6–0
Vergeer maintains her unbeaten record in Grand Slam singles tournaments, as she wins her eighth Australian Open title and 17th Grand Slam title.
Wheelchair Quad Singles – Final: David Wagner  def. Peter Norfolk  6–2, 6–3

January 28, 2011 (Friday)

Basketball
PBA Philippine Cup Finals (best-of-7 series):
Game 3 in Quezon City: San Miguel Beermen 103, Talk 'N Text Tropang Texters 82. Talk 'N Text lead series 2–1.

Extreme sport
Winter X Games XV in Aspen, United States:
Men's SuperPipe skiing:  Kevin Rolland  93.66 points  Torin Yater-Wallace  92.66  Simon Dumont  90.33
Rolland wins the event for the second successive year.
Men's Snowboard best method:  Scotty Lago   Ross Powers   Chas Guldemond 
Men's Snowmobile Speed & Style:  Joe Parsons  93.59 points  Heath Frisby  89.66  Cory Davis  100.48
Men's Snowboard big air:  Torstein Horgmo  80 points  Sebastien Toutant  79  Sage Kotsenburg  77

Figure skating
European Championships in Bern, Switzerland:
Ladies short program: (1) Kiira Korpi  63.50 points (2) Ksenia Makarova  60.35 (3) Sarah Meier  58.56
Ice dancing:  Nathalie Péchalat/Fabian Bourzat  167.40 points  Ekaterina Bobrova/Dmitri Soloviev  161.14  Sinead Kerr/John Kerr  157.49
Péchalat/Bourzat become the first ice dancing champions since Jayne Torvill and Christopher Dean in 1981 who didn't win any medal at previous championships.

Football (soccer)
AFC Asian Cup in Qatar:
Third place match:  2–3  
South American Youth Championship in Peru:
Group B: (teams in bold advance to second round)
 3–1 
 3–3 
Final standings:  10 points, Ecuador 7, Colombia 5, Paraguay 4, Bolivia 1.

Handball
World Men's Championship in Sweden:
7th place match:  31–28 
5th place match:  33–34 
Semifinals:
 29–26 
 28–24

Luge
FIL World Natural Track Championships in Umhausen, Austria:
Mixed team:   I (Renate Gietl, Anton Blasbichler, Patrick Pigneter/Florian Clara) 79 points   I (Melanie Batkowski, Gerald Kammerlander, Christian Schatz/Gerhard Mühlbacher) 72   I (Yekaterina Lavrentyeva, Juri Talikh, Pavel Porzhnev/Ivan Lazarev) 71

Skeleton
World Cup in St. Moritz, Switzerland:
Men:  Martins Dukurs  2:16.54 (1:08.63 / 1:07.91)  Frank Rommel  2:16.89 (1:08.58 / 1:08.31)  Ben Sandford  2:17.34 (1:08.66 / 1:08.68)
Standings (after 7 of 8 events): (1) Dukurs 1494 points (2) Sandro Stielicke  1266 (3) Rommel 1218
Dukurs secures the title for the second successive year with his fourth win of the season.
Women:  Shelley Rudman  2:19.17 (1:09.76 / 1:09.41)  Mellisa Hollingsworth  2:19.41 (1:09.85 / 1:09.56)  Anja Huber  2:19.43 (1:10.00 / 1:09.43)
Standings (after 7 of 8 events): (1) Huber 1485 points (2) Rudman 1474 (3) Hollingsworth 1364

Speed skating
World Cup 6 in Moscow, Russia:
Men's:
500m:  Pekka Koskela  35.15  Jamie Gregg  35.23  Jacques de Koning  35.24
Standings (after 9 of 12 races): (1) Joji Kato  615 points (2) Lee Kang-seok  590 (3) Keiichiro Nagashima  488
1500m:  Ivan Skobrev  1:45.49  Denny Morrison  1:46.25  Mark Tuitert  1:46.59
Standings (after 4 of 6 races): (1) Simon Kuipers  245 points (2) Håvard Bøkko  232 (3) Stefan Groothuis  222
Women's:
500m:  Jenny Wolf  37.90  Margot Boer  38.56  Heather Richardson  38.57
Standings (after 9 of 12 races): (1) Wolf 820 points (2) Lee Sang-hwa  650 (3) Boer 490
3000m:  Martina Sáblíková  4:04.03  Ireen Wüst  4:05.41  Brittany Schussler  4:10.45
Standings (after 4 of 6 races): (1) Stephanie Beckert  275 points (2) Sáblíková 260 (3) Jilleanne Rookard  236

Tennis
Australian Open in Melbourne, Australia, day 12:
Men's Singles – Semifinal: Andy Murray  def. David Ferrer  4–6, 7–6(2), 6–1, 7–6(2)
Murray reaches the final for the second successive year, and a Grand Slam final for the third time.
Women's Doubles – Final: Gisela Dulko  / Flavia Pennetta  def. Victoria Azarenka  / Maria Kirilenko  2–6, 7–5, 6–1
Dulko and Pennetta both win their first Grand Slam title.
Boys' Doubles – Final: Filip Horanský  / Jiří Veselý  def. Ben Wagland  / Andrew Whittington  6–4, 6–4
Girls' Doubles – Final: An-Sophie Mestach  / Demi Schuurs  def. Eri Hozumi  / Miyu Kato  6–2, 6–3
Wheelchair Men's Doubles – Final: Maikel Scheffers  / Shingo Kunieda  def. Stéphane Houdet  / Nicolas Peifer  6–3, 6–3
Wheelchair Women's Doubles – Final: Esther Vergeer  / Sharon Walraven  def. Aniek van Koot  / Jiske Griffioen  6–0, 6–2

January 27, 2011 (Thursday)

American football
NFL news: The Tennessee Titans and their head coach Jeff Fisher, the longest-tenured coach in the league, part ways. He had been in the post since 1994, when the franchise was known as the Houston Oilers.

Basketball
Euroleague Top 16, matchday 2:
Group E: Panathinaikos Athens  82–56  Unicaja Málaga
Standings (after 2 games): Panathinaikos Athens 2–0;  Lietuvos Rytas,  Caja Laboral 1–1; Unicaja Málaga 0–2.
Group F:
Maccabi Tel Aviv  99–58  Virtus Roma
Union Olimpija Ljubljana  67–68  Regal FC Barcelona
Standings (after 2 games): Regal FC Barcelona 2–0; Maccabi Tel Aviv, Union Olimpija Ljubljana 1–1; Virtus Roma 0–2.
Group H: Fenerbahçe Ülker  75–73  Power Electronics Valencia
Standings (after 2 games): Fenerbahçe Ülker 2–0; Power Electronics Valencia,  Olympiacos Piraeus 1–1;  Žalgiris Kaunas 0–2.

Extreme sport
Winter X Games XV in Aspen, United States:
Women's Slopestyle skiing:  Kaya Turski  93.66 points  Keri Herman  93.33  Grete Eliassen  93.00
Turski wins the gold for the second successive year.
Men's Snowmobile freestyle:  Daniel Bodin  91.33 points  Justin Hoyer  91.00  Caleb Moore  90.00
Women's SuperPipe skiing:  Sarah Burke  91.33 points  Brita Sigourney  86.00  Rosalind Groenewoud  84.00
Burke wins her fourth SuperPipe gold in five years.

Figure skating
European Championships in Bern, Switzerland:
Men short program: (1) Florent Amodio  78.11 points (2) Michal Březina  76.13 (3) Artur Gachinski  73.76
Pairs:  Aliona Savchenko/Robin Szolkowy  206.20 points  Yuko Kavaguti/Alexander Smirnov  203.61  Vera Bazarova/Yuri Larionov  188.24
Savchenko and Szolkowy win their fourth title in five years.

Football (soccer)
South American Youth Championship in Peru: (teams in bold advance to second round)
Group A:
 3–1 
 2–0 
Final standings:  10 points, Chile 6, Uruguay, Peru 4, Venezuela 3.
Copa Libertadores First Stage, first leg:
Cerro Porteño  1–0  Deportivo Petare
Bolívar  0–1  Unión Española

Handball
World Men's Championship in Sweden:
11th place match:  40–35 (ET) 
9th place match:  32–31 (ET)

Snooker
Championship League Group 4:
Final: Mark Allen  1–3 Ali Carter 
Carter advances to the winners group.

Tennis
Australian Open in Melbourne, Australia, day 11:
Men's Singles – Semifinal: Novak Djokovic  [3] def. Roger Federer  [2] 7–6(3), 7–5, 6–4
Djokovic reaches the Australian Open final for the second time, and a Grand Slam final for the fourth time.
Women's Singles – Semifinals:
Li Na  [9] def. Caroline Wozniacki  [1] 3–6, 7–5, 6–3
Li becomes the first Chinese player to reach a Grand Slam singles final.
Kim Clijsters  [3] def. Vera Zvonareva  [2] 6–3, 6–3
Clijsters reaches the Australian Open final for the second time, and a Grand Slam final for the eighth time.
Wheelchair Quad Doubles – Final: Andrew Lapthorne  / Peter Norfolk  def. Nicholas Taylor  / David Wagner  6–3, 6–3

January 26, 2011 (Wednesday)

Basketball
Euroleague Top 16, matchday 2:
Group E: Caja Laboral  86–89  Lietuvos Rytas
Standings:  Panathinaikos Athens 1–0; Lietuvos Rytas, Caja Laboral 1–1;  Unicaja Málaga 0–1.
Group G:
Partizan Belgrade  76–79  Efes Pilsen Istanbul
Montepaschi Siena  68–78  Real Madrid
Standings (after 2 games): Real Madrid, Efes Pilsen 2–0; Montepaschi Siena, Partizan Belgrade 0–2.
Group H: Žalgiris Kaunas  64–71  Olympiacos Piraeus
Standings:  Fenerbahçe Ülker,  Power Electronics Valencia 1–0; Olympiacos Piraeus 1–1; Žalgiris Kaunas 0–2.
 PBA Philippine Cup Finals (best-of-7 series):
Game 2 in Pasay: Talk 'N Text Tropang Texters 110, San Miguel Beermen 102. Talk 'N Text lead series 2–0.

Cricket
England in Australia:
4th ODI in Adelaide:  299/8 (50 overs; Jonathan Trott 102);  278/7 (50 overs). England win by 21 runs; Australia lead 7-match series 3–1.
Pakistan in New Zealand:
2nd ODI in Queenstown:  31/0 (4.2 overs); . Match abandoned; New Zealand lead 6-match series 1–0.

Figure skating
European Championships in Bern, Switzerland:
Short dance: (1) Nathalie Péchalat/Fabian Bourzat  66.91 points (2) Ekaterina Bobrova/Dmitri Soloviev  65.46 (3) Sinead Kerr/John Kerr  62.87
Pairs short program: (1) Aliona Savchenko/Robin Szolkowy  72.31 points (2) Yuko Kavaguti/Alexander Smirnov  69.49 (3) Vera Bazarova/Yuri Larionov  62.89

Football (soccer)
Copa Libertadores First Stage, first leg:
Corinthians  0–0  Deportes Tolima
Liverpool  2–2  Grêmio
Alianza Lima  0–2  Jaguares

Snowboarding
World Cup in Denver, United States:
Big Air:  Rocco van Straten  27.9 points  Zachary Stone  26.5  Michael Macho  20.7
Big Air standings (after 3 of 4 events): (1) Sebastien Toutant  1220 points (2) van Straten 1165 (3) Ståle Sandbech  1090
Overall Freestyle standings: (1) Toutant 1220 points (2) van Straten 1185 (3) Seppe Smits  1180

Tennis
Australian Open in Melbourne, Australia, day 10:
Men's Singles – Quarterfinals:
David Ferrer  [7] def. Rafael Nadal  [1] 6–4, 6–2, 6–3
Andy Murray  [5] def. Alexandr Dolgopolov  7–5, 6–3, 6–7(3), 6–3
Women's Singles – Quarterfinals:
Vera Zvonareva  [2] def. Petra Kvitová  [25] 6–2, 6–4
Kim Clijsters  [3] def. Agnieszka Radwańska  [12] 6–3, 7–6(4)
News: Former World Number 1 player Justine Henin announces her second retirement from the sport, citing a lingering injury to her right elbow.

January 25, 2011 (Tuesday)

Alpine skiing
Men's World Cup in Schladming, Austria:
Slalom:  Jean-Baptiste Grange  1:46.54 (54.62 / 51.92)  André Myhrer  1:46.58 (53.77 / 52.81)  Mattias Hargin  1:47.14 (54.22 / 52.92)
Slalom standings (after 7 of 10 races): (1) Ivica Kostelić  478 points (2) Grange 382 (3) Myhrer 333
Overall standings (after 23 of 38 races): (1) Kostelić 1075 points (2) Silvan Zurbriggen  643 (3) Aksel Lund Svindal  585

Football (soccer)
AFC Asian Cup in Qatar:
Semifinals:
 2–2 (3–0 pen.) 
 0–6 
South American Youth Championship in Peru: (teams in bold advance to second round)
Group B:
 2–1 
 0–1 
Standings: Brazil 10 points (4 matches), Ecuador, Colombia 4 (3),  3 (3), Bolivia 1 (3).
Copa Libertadores First Stage, first leg:
Independiente  2–0  Deportivo Quito

Handball
World Men's Championship in Sweden: (teams in bold advance to the semifinals)
Group I:
 25–35 
 30–24 
 34–28 
Final standings: France, Spain 9 points, Iceland, Hungary 4, Norway, Germany 2.
Group II:
 28–25 
 26–25 
 27–24 
Final standings: Denmark 10 points, Sweden 6, Croatia 5, Poland 4, Serbia 3, Argentina 2.

Snooker
Championship League Group 3:
Final: Mark King  2–3 Shaun Murphy 
Murphy advances to the winners group.

Tennis
Australian Open in Melbourne, Australia, day 9:
Men's Singles – Quarterfinals:
Roger Federer  [2] def. Stanislas Wawrinka  [19] 6–1, 6–3, 6–3
Novak Djokovic  [3] def. Tomáš Berdych  [6] 6–1, 7–6(5), 6–1
Women's Singles – Quarterfinals:
Caroline Wozniacki  [1] def. Francesca Schiavone  [6] 3–6, 6–3, 6–3
Li Na  [9] def. Andrea Petkovic  [30] 6–2, 6–4

January 24, 2011 (Monday)

Football (soccer)
South American Youth Championship in Peru: (teams in bold advance to second round)
Group A:
 1–3 
 1–1 
Standings: Argentina 10 points (4 matches),  4 (3), Venezuela, Chile 3 (3), Peru 1 (3).

Handball
World Men's Championship in Sweden:
Group I: (teams in bold advance to the semifinals)
 24–32 
 27–25 
 26–31 
Standings (after 4 matches): France, Spain 7 points, Iceland, Hungary 4, Germany 2, Norway 0.
15th place match:  24–29 
13th place match:  23–26

Tennis
Australian Open in Melbourne, Australia, day 8:
Men's Singles – 4th Round:
Rafael Nadal  [1] def. Marin Čilić  [15] 6–2, 6–4, 6–3
Alexandr Dolgopolov  def. Robin Söderling  [4] 1–6, 6–3, 6–1, 4–6, 6–2
Andy Murray  [5] def. Jürgen Melzer  [11] 6–3, 6–1, 6–1
David Ferrer  [7] def. Milos Raonic  4–6, 6–2, 6–3, 6–4
Women's Singles – 4th Round:
Vera Zvonareva  [2] def. Iveta Benešová  6–4, 6–1
Kim Clijsters  [3] def. Ekaterina Makarova  7–6(3), 6–2
Agnieszka Radwańska  [12] def. Peng Shuai  7–5, 3–6, 7–5
Petra Kvitová  [25] def. Flavia Pennetta  [22] 3–6, 6–3, 6–3

January 23, 2011 (Sunday)

Alpine skiing
Men's World Cup in Kitzbühel, Austria:
Slalom:  Jean-Baptiste Grange  1:40.93 (52.60 / 48.33)  Ivica Kostelić  1:41.21 (52.20 / 49.01)  Giuliano Razzoli  1:41.62 (52.79 / 48.83)
Slalom standings (after 6 of 10 races): (1) Kostelić 433 points (2) Marcel Hirscher  326 (3) Grange 282
Combined:  Kostelić 3:40.84 (1:59.63 / 52.20 / 49.01)  Silvan Zurbriggen  3:42.77 (1:59.89 / 52.96 / 49.92)  Romed Baumann  3:47.51 (1:59.54 / 55.93 / 52.04)
Combined standings (after 2 of 4 races): (1) Kostelić 200 points (2) Carlo Janka  112 (3) Zurbriggen 98
Overall standings (after 22 of 38 races): (1) Kostelić 1030 points (2) Zurbriggen 629 (3) Aksel Lund Svindal  585
Women's World Cup in Cortina, Italy:
Super-G:  Lindsey Vonn  1:22.64  Maria Riesch  1:22.69  Lara Gut  1:23.52
Super G standings (after 4 of 7 races): (1) Vonn 380 points (2) Riesch 229 (3) Gut 205
Overall standings (after 21 of 38 races): (1) Riesch 1232 points (2) Vonn 1087 (3) Elisabeth Görgl  628

American football
NFL playoffs – Conference Championships:
NFC: Green Bay Packers 21, Chicago Bears 14
The Packers win the NFC Championship Game for the third time.
AFC: Pittsburgh Steelers 24, New York Jets 19
The Steelers win the AFC Championship Game for the second time in three years, and a record-extending eighth time overall.

Badminton
BWF Super Series:
Malaysia Super Series in Kuala Lumpur:
Men's singles: Lee Chong Wei  def. Taufik Hidayat  21–8, 21–17
Women's singles: Wang Shixian  def. Wang Yihan  21–18, 21–14
Men's doubles: Chai Biao /Guo Zhendong  def. Mads-Conrads Petersen /Jonas Rasmussen  21–16, 21–14
Women's doubles: Tian Qing /Zhao Yunlei  def. Wang Xiaoli /Yu Yang  21–12, 6–21, 21–17
Mixed doubles: He Hanbin /Ma Jin  def. Tao Jiaming /Tian Qing  21–13, 13–21, 21–16

Biathlon
World Cup 6 in Antholz, Italy:
Women's 12.5 km Mass Start:  Tora Berger  33:56.3 (0+1+0+1)  Marie-Laure Brunet  33:56.9 (0+0+0+1)  Darya Domracheva  34:02.1 (0+0+0+0)
Mass start standings (after 2 of 5 races): (1) Brunet 97 points (2) Berger 90 (3) Helena Ekholm  85
Overall standings (after 14 of 26 races): (1) Kaisa Mäkäräinen  574 points (2) Ekholm 546 (3) Andrea Henkel  523
Men's 4 x 7.5 km Relay:   (Christoph Stephan, Daniel Böhm, Arnd Peiffer, Michael Greis) 1:10:17.2 (0+7)   (Christian de Lorenzi, Rene Laurent Vuillermoz, Lukas Hofer, Markus Windisch) 1:10:35.8 (0+9)   (Emil Hegle Svendsen, Ole Einar Bjørndalen, Alexander Os, Tarjei Bø) 1:10:45.4 (0+8)
Standings (after 3 of 4 races): (1) Germany 163 points (2) Norway 156 (3)  &  122

Bobsleigh
World Cup and FIBT European Championships in Winterberg, Germany:
Four-man:  Manuel Machata/Richard Adjei/Andreas Bredau/Florian Becke  1:50.15 (55.29 / 54.86)  Thomas Florschütz/Ronny Listner/Kevin Kuske/Andreas Barucha  1:50.28 (55.10 / 55.18)  Alexandr Zubkov/Filipp Yegorov/Dmitry Trunenkov/Nikolay Hrenkov  1:50.28 (55.27 / 55.01)
Machata, Adjei, Bredau and Becke all win their first European title.
Standings (after 6 of 8 races): (1) Machata 1261 points (2) Steve Holcomb  1186 (3) Karl Angerer  1090

Bowls
World Indoor Championships in Hopton-on-Sea, England:
Final: Paul Foster  def. Alex Marshall  11–5, 8–8
Foster wins his fourth world title.

Cricket
England in Australia:
3rd ODI in Sydney:  214 (48 overs);  215/6 (46 overs). Australia win by 4 wickets; lead 7-match series 3–0.
India in South Africa:
5th ODI in Centurion:  250/9 (46/46 overs; Hashim Amla 116*);  234 (40.2 overs; Yusuf Pathan 105). South Africa win by 33 runs (D/L); win 5-match series 3–2.

Cross-country skiing
World Cup in Otepää, Estonia:
Men's Classic Sprint:  Eirik Brandsdal  3:25.5  Ola Vigen Hattestad  3:25.5  Nikita Kriukov  3:25.8
Sprint standings (after 7 of 11 races): (1) Emil Jönsson  330 points (2) Hattestad 264 (3) Jesper Modin  220
Overall standings (after 21 of 31 races): (1) Dario Cologna  1197 points (2) Petter Northug  774 (3) Lukáš Bauer  698
Women's Classic Sprint:  Petra Majdič  3:07.2  Hanna Brodin  3:07.9  Maiken Caspersen Falla  3:09.2
Sprint standings (after 7 of 11 races): (1) Majdič 354 points (2) Kikkan Randall  291 (3) Arianna Follis  288
Overall standings (after 21 of 31 races): (1) Justyna Kowalczyk  1401 points (2) Marit Bjørgen  922 (3) Follis 880

Cycling
UCI World Tour:
Tour Down Under in Australia:
Stage 6, Adelaide to Adelaide, :  Ben Swift  1h 53' 47"  Greg Henderson  s.t.  Matthew Goss   s.t.
Final overall standings: (1) Cameron Meyer   17h 54' 27" (2) Goss  + 2" (3) Swift + 8"

Football (soccer)
Central American Cup in Panama:
Third place match:  0–0 (4–5 pen.)  
Final:   2–1  
Honduras win the championship for the third time.
South American Youth Championship in Peru: (teams in bold advance to final group)
Group B:
 1–0 
 1–1 
Standings: Brazil 7 points (3 matches), Ecuador 4 (2), Paraguay 3 (3), Bolivia,  1 (2).
Commonwealth of Independent States Cup in Saint Petersburg, Russia:
Final: Inter Baku  0–0 (6–5 pen.)  Shakhtyor Soligorsk
Baku win the title for the first time.

Freestyle skiing
World Cup in Lake Placid, United States:
Moguls men:  Guilbaut Colas  25.70 points  Mikaël Kingsbury  25.59  Pierre-Alexandre Rousseau  25.16
Moguls standings (after 6 of 11 events): (1) Colas 500 points (2) Kingsbury 355 (3) Alexandre Bilodeau  299
Overall standings: (1) Colas 83 points (2) Andreas Matt  64 (3) Qi Guangpu  63
Moguls women:  Hannah Kearney  26.12 points  Chloé Dufour-Lapointe  24.85  Kristi Richards  24.57
Moguls standings (after 6 of 11 events): (1) Kearney 509 points (2) Jennifer Heil  390 (3) Richards 286
Overall standings: (1) Kearney 85 points (2) Xu Mengtao  68 (3) Kelsey Serwa  66

Golf
PGA Tour:
Bob Hope Classic in Palm Desert and La Quinta, California:
Winner: Jhonattan Vegas  333 (−27)PO
In his fifth PGA Tour event, Vegas wins his maiden title, and also the first PGA Tour title by a Venezuelan, defeating defending champion Bill Haas  and Gary Woodland  in a playoff.
European Tour:
Abu Dhabi HSBC Golf Championship in Abu Dhabi, United Arab Emirates:
Winner: Martin Kaymer  264 (−24)
Kaymer wins the tournament for the third time in four years, and wins his ninth European Tour title.
Champions Tour:
Mitsubishi Electric Championship at Hualalai in Kaūpūlehu, Hawaii:
Winner: John Cook  194 (−22)
Cook wins his sixth Champions Tour title.

Handball
World Men's Championship in Sweden:
Group II: (teams in bold advance to semifinals)
 29–25 
 24–31 
 27–26 
Standings (after 4 matches): Denmark 8 points, Sweden 6, Poland 4, Croatia 3, Argentina 2, Serbia 1.
23rd place match:  23–33 
21st place match:  18–28 
19th place match:  29–30 
17th place match:  35–39

Luge
World Cup in Altenberg, Germany:
Men's singles:  Felix Loch  1:50.725 (55.090 / 55.635)  Armin Zöggeler  1:50.866 (55.321 / 55.545)  Albert Demtschenko  1:50.915 (55.356 / 55.559)
Standings (after 7 of 9 events): (1) Zöggeler 610 points (2) Loch 545 (3) David Möller  440
Team relay:   (Tatjana Hüfner, Felix Loch, Tobias Wendl/Tobias Arlt) 2:25.216 (47.434 / 48.724 / 49.058)   (Tatiana Ivanova, Albert Demtschenko, Vladislav Yuzhakov/Vladimir Makhnutin) 2:25.746 (47.912 / 48.685 / 49.149)   (Nina Reithmayer, Daniel Pfister, Georg Fischler/Peter Penz) 2:25.941 (47.823 / 49.161 / 48.957)
Standings (after 5 of 6 events): (1) Germany 500 points (2)  355 (3) Austria & Russia 326
Germany win their fifth consecutive title.

Nordic combined
World Cup in Chaux-Neuve, France:
HS 117 / 10 km:  Jason Lamy-Chappuis  22:00.3  Felix Gottwald  22:07.5  Mikko Kokslien  22:07.7
Standings (after 11 of 13 races): (1) Lamy-Chappuis 789 points (2) Kokslien 609 (3) Gottwald 556

Rugby union
Heineken Cup pool stage, matchday 6 (teams in bold advance to the Heineken Cup knockout stages, team in italics advances to the Amlin Challenge Cup knockout stages):
Pool 5:
Leicester Tigers  62–15  Benetton Treviso
Perpignan  37–5  Scarlets
Final standings: Perpignan 22 points (6–3 in head-to head competition points), Leicester Tigers 22 (3–6), Scarlets 15, Benetton Treviso 1.
Pool 6:
Newport Gwent Dragons  16–23  Glasgow Warriors
London Wasps  21–16  Toulouse
Final standings: Toulouse 22 points, London Wasps 19, Glasgow Warriors 12, Newport Gwent Dragons 2.
Quarterfinal matchups:
Northampton Saints  vs.  Ulster
Leinster  vs.  Leicester Tigers
Perpignan  vs.  Toulon
Biarritz  vs.  Toulouse
Amlin Challenge Cup pool stage, matchday 6 (teams in bold advance to the knockout stages):
Pool 3: Bourgoin  –  Newcastle Falcons — postponed due to a frozen pitch, and will not be played.
Final standings:  Montpellier 21 points (6 matches),  Exeter Chiefs 16 (6), Newcastle Falcons 9 (5), Bourgoin 6 (5).
Pool 4:
Crociati Parma  17–34  Stade Français
Leeds Carnegie  26–6  București Oaks
Final standings: Stade Français 29 points, Leeds Carnegie 19, București Oaks, Crociati Parma 5.
Quarterfinal matchups:
Stade Français  vs.  Montpellier
Brive  vs.  Munster
La Rochelle  vs.  Clermont
Harlequins  vs.  London Wasps

Skeleton
World Cup and FIBT European Championships in Winterberg, Germany:
Men:  Martins Dukurs  1:55.41 (57.48 / 57.93)  Sergey Chudinov  1:55.61 (57.55 / 58.06)  Aleksandr Tretyakov  1:55.71 (57.78 / 57.93)
Dukurs wins his second consecutive European title.
Standings (after 6 of 8 events): (1) Dukurs 1269 points (2) Tretyakov 1155 (3) Chudinov 1109

Ski jumping
World Cup in Zakopane, Poland:
HS 134:  Kamil Stoch  254.0 points  Tom Hilde  249.5  Michael Uhrmann  246.8
Standings (after 18 of 26 events): (1) Thomas Morgenstern  1384 points (2) Simon Ammann  953 (3) Andreas Kofler  915

Speed skating
World Sprint Championships in Heerenveen, Netherlands:
Men:  Lee Kyou-hyuk  139.255 points   Mo Tae-bum  139.365  Shani Davis  139.600
Lee wins his fourth world title in five years.
Women:  Christine Nesbitt  152.220 points  Annette Gerritsen  154.015  Margot Boer  154.025
Nesbitt wins her first world title.

Tennis
Australian Open in Melbourne, Australia, day 7:
Men's Singles – 4th Round:
Roger Federer  [2] def. Tommy Robredo  6–3, 3–6, 6–3, 6–2
Novak Djokovic  [3] def. Nicolás Almagro  [14] 6–3, 6–4, 6–0
Tomáš Berdych  [6] def. Fernando Verdasco  [9] 6–4, 6–2, 6–3
Stanislas Wawrinka  [19] def. Andy Roddick  [8] 6–3, 6–4, 6–4
Women's Singles – 4th Round:
Caroline Wozniacki  [1] def. Anastasija Sevastova  6–3, 6–4
Francesca Schiavone  [6] def. Svetlana Kuznetsova  [23] 6–4, 1–6, 16–14
This was the longest women's match by time in a Grand Slam event in the open era, lasting 4 hours, 44 minutes.
Li Na  [9] def. Victoria Azarenka  [8] 6–3, 6–3
Andrea Petkovic  [30] def. Maria Sharapova  [14] 6–2, 6–3

January 22, 2011 (Saturday)

Alpine skiing
Men's World Cup in Kitzbühel, Austria:
Downhill:  Didier Cuche  1:57.72  Bode Miller  1:58.70  Adrien Théaux  1:58.90
Downhill standings (after 5 of 9 races): (1) Cuche 279 points (2) Silvan Zurbriggen  270 (3) Michael Walchhofer  269
Overall standings (after 20 of 38 races): (1) Ivica Kostelić  850 points (2) Aksel Lund Svindal  585 (3) Cuche 573
Women's World Cup in Cortina, Italy:
Downhill:  Maria Riesch  1:39.30  Julia Mancuso  1:40.21  Lindsey Vonn  1:40.30
Downhill standings (after 5 of 9 races): (1) Vonn 420 points (2) Riesch 357 (3) Mancuso 217
Overall standings (after 20 of 38 races): (1) Riesch 1152 points (2) Vonn 987 (3) Elisabeth Görgl  592

Basketball
 PBA Philippine Cup Finals (best-of-7 series):
Game 1 in Victorias: Talk 'N Text Tropang Texters 91, San Miguel Beermen 82. Talk 'N Text lead the series 1–0.

Biathlon
World Cup 6 in Antholz, Italy:
Women's 4 x 6 km Relay:   (Svetlana Sleptsova, Anna Bogaliy-Titovets, Natalia Guseva, Olga Zaitseva) 1:11:14.7 (0+6)   (Jenny Jonsson, Anna Carin Olofsson-Zidek, Anna Maria Nilsson, Helena Ekholm) 1:12:11.8 (0+7)   (Sabrina Buchholz, Kathrin Hitzer, Miriam Gössner, Andrea Henkel) 1:13:34.8 (4+13)
Standings (after 3 of 4 races): (1) Sweden 152 points (2) Germany 146 (3) Russia 143
Men's 15 km Mass Start:  Martin Fourcade  35:33.4 (0+0+1+0)  Björn Ferry  35:50.6 (0+0+1+1)  Anton Shipulin  35:51.0 (1+1+0+0)
Mass start standings (after 2 of 5 races): (1) Fourcade 103 points (2) Tarjei Bø  & Emil Hegle Svendsen  86
Overall standings (after 14 of 26 races): (1) Bø 598 points (2) Svendsen 592 (3) Michael Greis  485

Bobsleigh
World Cup and FIBT European Championships in Winterberg, Germany:
Two-man:  Alexandr Zubkov/Alexey Voyevoda  1:52.21 (56.20 / 56.01)  Thomas Florschütz/Kevin Kuske  1:52.35 (56.16 / 56.19)  Karl Angerer/Alex Mann  1:52.44 (56.37 / 56.07)
Standings (after 6 of 8 races): (1) Zubkov 1238 points (2) Manuel Machata  1187 (3) Simone Bertazzo  1107

Cricket
Pakistan in New Zealand:
1st ODI in Wellington:  124 (37.3 overs; Tim Southee 5/33);  125/1 (17.2 overs). New Zealand win by 9 wickets; lead 6-match series 1–0.

Cross-country skiing
World Cup in Otepää, Estonia:
Men's 15 km Classic:  Eldar Rønning  37:27.2  Daniel Rickardsson  37:42.3  Maxim Vylegzhanin  37:44.8
Distance standings (after 12 of 17 races): (1) Dario Cologna  481 points (2) Alexander Legkov  406 (3) Lukáš Bauer  400
Overall standings (after 20 of 31 races): (1) Cologna 1197 points (2) Petter Northug  738 (3) Bauer 698
Women's 10 km Classic:  Marit Bjørgen  27:02.1  Justyna Kowalczyk  27:34.1  Therese Johaug  27:43.7
Distance standings (after 12 of 17 races): (1) Kowalczyk 672 points (2) Bjørgen 510 (3) Johaug 430
Overall standings (after 20 of 31 races): (1) Kowalczyk 1351 points (2) Bjørgen 896 (3) Arianna Follis  880

Cycling
UCI World Tour:
Tour Down Under in Australia:
Stage 5, McLaren Vale to Willunga, :  Francisco Ventoso  3h 06' 10"  Michael Matthews  s.t.  Matthew Goss  s.t.
Overall standings: (1) Cameron Meyer   16h 00' 40" (2) Goss  + 8" (3) Laurens ten Dam  + 10"

Equestrianism
Dressage:
FEI World Cup Western European League:
7th competition in Amsterdam (CDI-W):  Adelinde Cornelissen  on Parzival  Isabell Werth  on Warum nicht FRH  Patrik Kittel  on Watermill Scandic H.B.C.
Standings (after 7 of 10 competitions): (1) Ulla Salzgeber  & Werth 74 points (3) Cornelissen 63

Football (soccer)
AFC Asian Cup in Qatar:
Quarterfinals:
 1–0 (a.e.t.) 
 0–1 (a.e.t.) 
South American Youth Championship in Peru: (teams in bold advance to the second stage)
Group A:
 1–1 
 0–4 
Standings: Argentina 7 points (3 matches), Uruguay 4 (3), Chile 3 (2), Venezuela 2 (2),  0 (2).
African Under-17 Championship in Rwanda:
Final:   2–1  
Burkina Faso win the championship for the first time. Both teams qualify for the FIFA U-17 World Cup.

Freestyle skiing
World Cup in Lake Placid, United States:
Moguls men:  Guilbaut Colas  25.81 points  Alexandre Bilodeau  25.59  Jeremy Cota  25.31
Moguls standings (after 5 of 11 events): (1) Colas 400 points (2) Bilodeau & Mikaël Kingsbury  275
Overall standings: (1) Colas 80 points (2) Andreas Matt  64 (3) Qi Guangpu  63
Moguls women:  Hannah Kearney  25.45 points  Jennifer Heil  24.72  Audrey Robichaud  24.41
Moguls standings (after 5 of 11 events): (1) Kearney 409 points (2) Heil 340 (3) Justine Dufour-Lapointe  227
Overall standings: (1) Kearney 82 points (2) Heil & Xu Mengtao  68

Handball
World Men's Championship in Sweden: (teams in strike are eliminated)
Group I:
 32–27 
 27–24 
 37–24 
Standings (after 3 matches): France, Spain 5 points, Iceland 4, Germany, Hungary 2, Norway 0.
Group II:
 36–18 
 24–28 
 28–27 
Standings (after 3 matches): Denmark 6 points, Sweden 4, Croatia 3, Poland, Argentina 2, Serbia 1.
Presidents Cup:
 34–28 
 25–26 
 21–29 
 24–29 (OT) 
 33–38 
 30–37

Korfball
Europa Cup in Budapest, Hungary:
7th place match: CC Oeiras  19–15  CK Vacarisses
5th place match: Szentendre KK  23–12  KV Adler Rauxel
Third place match:  České Budějovice  19–18  Trojans KC
Final:  R Scaldis SC  23–33   Koog Zaandijk
Koog Zaandijk win the tournament for the second time.

Luge
World Cup in Altenberg, Germany:
Women's singles:  Tatjana Hüfner  1:45.626 (53.015 / 52.611)  Natalie Geisenberger  1:45.648 (52.861 / 52.787)  Anke Wischnewski  1:46.270 (53.253 / 53.017)
Hüfner wins her sixth race of the season.
Standings (after 7 of 9 events): (1) Hüfner 685 points (2) Geisenberger 560 (3) Wischnewski 485
Doubles:  Andreas Linger/Wolfgang Linger  1:24.076 (42.062 / 42.014)  Tobias Wendl/Tobias Arlt  1:24.352 (42.184 / 42.168)  Toni Eggert/Sascha Benecken  1:24.514 (42.294 / 42.220)
Standings (after 7 of 9 events): (1) Wendl/Arlt 615 points (2) Christian Oberstolz/Patrick Gruber  540 (3) Linger/Linger 492

Mixed martial arts
UFC: Fight For The Troops 2 in Kileen, Texas, United States:
Lightweight bout: Matt Wiman  def. Cole Miller  by unanimous decision (29–28, 30–27, 30–27)
Heavyweight bout: Pat Barry  def. Joey Beltran  by unanimous decision (30–27, 29–28, 29–28)
Featherweight bout: Mark Hominick  def. George Roop  by TKO (punches)
Heavyweight bout: Matt Mitrione  def. Tim Hague  by TKO (punches)
Lightweight bout: Melvin Guillard  def. Evan Dunham  by TKO (strikes)

Nordic combined
World Cup in Chaux-Neuve, France:
HS 117 / 10 km:  David Kreiner  21:59.2  Mikko Kokslien  21:59.8  Felix Gottwald  22:00.7
Standings (after 10 of 13 races): (1) Jason Lamy-Chappuis  689 points (2) Kokslien 549 (3) Gottwald 476

Rugby union
Heineken Cup pool stage, matchday 6 (teams in bold advance to the Heineken Cup knockout stages, team in italics advances to the Amlin Challenge Cup knockout stages):
Pool 1:
Castres  12–23  Northampton Saints
Edinburgh  14–21  Cardiff Blues
Final standings: Northampton Saints 25 points, Cardiff Blues 14, Castres 11, Edinburgh 8.
Pool 3:
Munster  28–14  London Irish
Ospreys  29–17  Toulon
Final standings: Toulon 17 points, Munster 16, Ospreys 14, London Irish 9.
Pool 4:
Aironi  6–43  Ulster
Biarritz  26–19  Bath
Final standings: Biarritz 22 points (6–4 in head-to head competition points), Ulster 22 (4–6), Bath 14, Aironi 4.
Amlin Challenge Cup pool stage, matchday 6 (teams in bold advance to the knockout stages):
Pool 1:
Connacht  83–7  Cavalieri Prato
Harlequins  39–17  Bayonne
Final standings: Harlequins 24 points, Connacht 15 (8–1 in head-to head competition points), Bayonne 15 (1–8), Cavalieri Prato 4.
Pool 2:
El Salvador  5–50  Sale Sharks
Petrarca Padova  20–24  Brive
Final standings: Brive 27 points, Sale Sharks 21, Petrarca Padova 6, El Salvador 4.
Pool 3:
Bourgoin  –  Newcastle Falcons — postponed to January 23 due to a frozen pitch
Montpellier  32–30  Exeter Chiefs
Standings: Montpellier 21 points (6 matches), Exeter Chiefs 16 (6), Newcastle Falcons 9 (5), Bourgoin 6 (5).

Skeleton
World Cup and FIBT European Championships in Winterberg, Germany:
Women:  Shelley Rudman  1:57.77 (58.75 / 59.02)  Anja Huber  1:57.99 (58.90 / 59.09)  Amy Gough  1:58.52 (59.21 / 59.31)
Rudman wins her second European title in three years.
Standings (after 6 of 8 events): (1) Huber 1285 points (2) Rudman 1249 (3) Mellisa Hollingsworth  1154

Ski jumping
World Cup in Zakopane, Poland:
HS 134:  Simon Ammann  276.3 points  Thomas Morgenstern  268.9  Tom Hilde  267.1
Standings (after 17 of 26 events): (1) Morgenstern 1348 points (2) Ammann 903 (3) Andreas Kofler  901

Snowboarding
World Championships in La Molina, Spain:
Parallel Slalom men:  Benjamin Karl   Simon Schoch   Rok Marguč 
Karl wins his second world title of the championships.
Parallel Slalom women:  Hilde-Katrine Engeli   Nicolien Sauerbreij   Claudia Riegler 
Engeli wins her first world title.
Slopestyle men:  Seppe Smits  28.7 points  Niklas Mattson  28.1  Ville Paumola  26.2
Smits wins his first world title.
Slopestyle women:  Enni Rukajärvi  28.2 points  Šárka Pančochová  25.2  Shelly Gotlieb  21.6
Rukajärvi wins her first world title.

Tennis
Australian Open in Melbourne, Australia, day 6:
Men's Singles – 3rd Round:
Rafael Nadal  [1] def. Bernard Tomic  6–2, 7–5, 6–3
Robin Söderling  [4] def. Jan Hernych  6–3, 6–1, 6–4
Andy Murray  [5] def. Guillermo García-López  [32] 6–1, 6–1, 6–2
David Ferrer  [7] def. Ričardas Berankis  6–2, 6–2, 6–1
Milos Raonic  def. Mikhail Youzhny  [10] 6–4, 7–5, 4–6, 6–4
Women's Singles – 3rd Round:
Vera Zvonareva  [2] def. Lucie Šafářová  [31] 6–3, 7–6(9)
Kim Clijsters  [3] def. Alizé Cornet  7–6(3), 6–3
Petra Kvitová  [25] def. Samantha Stosur  [5] 7–6(5), 6–3
Flavia Pennetta  [22] def. Shahar Pe'er  [10] 3–6, 7–6(3), 6–4

January 21, 2011 (Friday)

Alpine skiing
Men's World Cup in Kitzbühel, Austria:
Super-G:  Ivica Kostelić  1:17.33  Georg Streitberger  1:17.56  Aksel Lund Svindal  1:17.61
Super G standings (after 4 of 7 races): (1) Streitberger 227 points (2) Didier Cuche  179 (3) Romed Baumann  163
Overall standings (after 19 of 38 races): (1) Kostelić 826 points (2) Svindal 571 (3) Silvan Zurbriggen  509
Women's World Cup in Cortina, Italy:
Super-G:  Lindsey Vonn  1:11.66  Anja Pärson  1:12.09  Anna Fenninger  1:12.13
Super G standings (after 3 of 7 races): (1) Vonn 280 points (2) Maria Riesch  149 (3) Lara Gut  145
Overall standings (after 19 of 38 races): (1) Riesch 1052 points (2) Vonn 927 (3) Tanja Poutiainen  580

Biathlon
World Cup 6 in Antholz, Italy:
Women's 7.5 km Sprint:  Tora Berger  20:08.1 (0+0)  Anastasiya Kuzmina  20:37.2 (0+1)  Olga Zaitseva  20:44.5 (0+1)
Sprint standings (after 6 of 10 races): (1) Kaisa Mäkäräinen  249 points (2) Kuzmina 237 (3) Andrea Henkel  216
Overall standings (after 13 of 26 races): (1) Mäkäräinen 560 points (2) Helena Ekholm  521 (3) Henkel 497

Bobsleigh
World Cup and FIBT European Championships in Winterberg, Germany:
Two-women:  Sandra Kiriasis/Berit Wiacker  1:55.06 (57.66 / 57.40)  Anja Schneiderheinze-Stöckel/Christin Senkel  1:55.55 (57.92 / 57.63)  Shauna Rohbock/Valerie Fleming  1:55.66 (57.97 / 57.69)
Kiriasis wins her fifth European title in six years, and Wiacker wins her fourth in six years.
Standings (after 6 of 8 races): (1) Kiriasis 1286 points (2) Cathleen Martini  1187 (3) Kaillie Humphries  1024

Cricket
England in Australia:
2nd ODI in Hobart:  230 (48.3 overs; Shaun Marsh 110);  184 (45 overs). Australia win by 46 runs; lead 7-match series 2–0.
India in South Africa:
4th ODI in Port Elizabeth:  265/7 (50 overs);  142/6 (32.5/46 overs). South Africa win by 48 runs (D/L); 5-match series tied 2–2.

Cycling
UCI World Tour:
Tour Down Under in Australia:
Stage 4, Norwood to Strathalbyn, :  Cameron Meyer  2h 57' 55"  Thomas De Gendt  s.t.  Laurens ten Dam  + 3"
Overall standings: (1) Meyer  12h 54' 30" (2) ten Dam + 10" (3) Matthew Goss  + 12"

Football (soccer)
AFC Asian Cup in Qatar:
Quarterfinals:
 3–2 
 2–1 
Central American Cup in Panama:
Fifth place match:  1–2 
Guatemala qualify for the CONCACAF Gold Cup.
Semifinals:
 2–0 
 1–1 (2–4 pen.) 
African Under-17 Championship in Kigali, Rwanda:
Third place match:   2–1 
Both teams qualify for the FIFA U-17 World Cup.

Freestyle skiing
World Cup in Kreischberg, Austria:
Half Pipe men:  Xavier Bertoni  43.8 points  Benoit Valentin  42.7  Nils Lauper  39.0
Half Pipe women:  Rosalind Groenewoud  43.5 points  Virginie Faivre  43.3  Katrien Aerts  41.8
World Cup in Lake Placid, United States:
Aerials men:  Qi Guangpu  250.70 points  Ryan St. Onge  246.21  Anton Kushnir  241.42
Aerials standings (after 4 of 8 events): (1) Qi 316 points (2) Jia Zongyang  238 (3) Anton Kushnir  228
Overall standings: (1) Andreas Matt  64 points (2) Qi 63 (3) Guilbaut Colas  60
Aerials women:  Ashley Caldwell  187.65 points  Alla Tsuper  186.42  Xu Mengtao  183.82
Aerials standings (after 4 of 8 events): (1) Xu 340 points (2) Cheng Shuang  216 (3) Zhang Xin  177
Overall standings: (1) Xu 68 points (2) Kelsey Serwa  66 points (3) Hannah Kearney  62

Korfball
Europa Cup in Budapest, Hungary:
Group A:
CC Oeiras  15–19  České Budějovice
Szentendre KK  6–26  R Scaldis SC
Standings: Scaldis 9 points, České Budějovice 6, Szentendre 3, CC Oeiras 0.
Group B:
Koog Zaandijk  31–10  Trojans KC
CK Vacarisses  19–22  KV Adler Rauxel
Standings: Koog Zaandijk 9 points, Trojans 6, Adler Rauxel 3, Vacarisses 0.

Rugby union
Heineken Cup pool stage, matchday 6 (team in bold advances to the knockout stages):
Pool 2:
Racing Métro  11–36  Leinster
Saracens  14–24  Clermont
Final standings: Leinster 24 points, Clermont 19, Racing Métro 9, Saracens 6.
Clermont have also secured at least a place in the Amlin Challenge Cup knockout stages. They still have a mathematical chance of a Heineken Cup quarterfinal place.

Ski jumping
World Cup in Zakopane, Poland:
HS 134:  Adam Małysz  269.9 points  Andreas Kofler  264.5  Severin Freund  264.0
Standings (after 16 of 26 events): (1) Thomas Morgenstern  1268 points (2) Kofler 851 (3) Simon Ammann  803

Snowboarding
World Championships in La Molina, Spain:
Both men's and women's parallel slalom events were postponed to January 22 due to high winds.

Tennis
Australian Open in Melbourne, Australia, day 5:
Men's Singles – 3rd Round:
Roger Federer  [2] def. Xavier Malisse  6–3, 6–3, 6–1
Novak Djokovic  [3] def. Viktor Troicki  6–2 retired
Tomáš Berdych  [6] def. Richard Gasquet  6–2, 7–6(3), 6–2
Andy Roddick  [8] def. Robin Haase  2–6, 7–6(2), 6–2, 6–2
Fernando Verdasco  [9] def. Kei Nishikori  6–2, 6–4, 6–3
Women's Singles – 3rd Round:
Caroline Wozniacki  [1] def. Dominika Cibulková  6–4, 6–3
Andrea Petkovic  def. Venus Williams  [4] 1–0 retired
Francesca Schiavone  [6] def. Monica Niculescu  6–0, 7–6(2)
Victoria Azarenka  [8] def. Chanelle Scheepers  6–3, 6–3
Li Na  [9] def. Barbora Záhlavová-Strýcová  6–2, 6–1

January 20, 2011 (Thursday)

Basketball
Euroleague Top 16, matchday 1:
Group E: Unicaja Málaga  71–76  Caja Laboral
Group F:
Regal FC Barcelona  81–71  Maccabi Tel Aviv
Virtus Roma  63–64  Union Olimpija Ljubljana
Group H: Olympiacos Piraeus  70–84  Fenerbahçe Ülker

Biathlon
World Cup 6 in Antholz, Italy:
Men's 10 km Sprint:  Anton Shipulin  23:36.2 (0+0)  Michael Greis  23:46.2 (0+0)  Lars Berger  23:56.7 (0+1)
Sprint standings (after 6 of 10 races): (1) Tarjei Bø  254 points (2) Emil Hegle Svendsen  231 (3) Greis 222
Overall standings (after 13 of 26 races): (1) Bø 572 points (2) Svendsen 560 (3) Greis 447

Cycling
UCI World Tour:
Tour Down Under in Australia:
Stage 3, Unley to Stirling, :  Michael Matthews  3h 11' 47"  André Greipel  s.t.  Matthew Goss   s.t.
Overall standings: (1) Goss  9h 56' 25" (2) Greipel + 2" (3) Robbie McEwen  + 4"

Football (soccer)
South American Youth Championship in Peru:
Group B:
 0–1 
 1–3 
Standings: Brazil 6 points (2 matches), Paraguay 3 (2),  1 (1), Colombia 1 (2), Bolivia 0 (1).

Handball
World Men's Championship in Sweden: (teams in bold advance to the main round)
Group A:
 26–27 
 36–26 
 28–28 
Final standings: France, Spain 9 points, Germany 6, Tunisia, Egypt, Bahrain 2.
Group B:
 32–33 
 29–22 
 30–32 
Final standings: Iceland 10 points, Hungary 8, Norway 6, Japan 4, Austria 2, Brazil 0.
Group C:
 27–18 
 29–34 
 28–38 
Final standings: Denmark 10 points, Croatia 7, Serbia 5, Algeria, Romania 4, Australia 0.
Group D:
 31–26 
 35–25 
 21–24 
Final standings: Sweden, Poland 8 points, Argentina 7, South Korea 5, Slovakia, Chile 1.

Korfball
Europa Cup in Budapest, Hungary:
Group A:
R Scaldis SC  22–6  CC Oeiras
Szentendre KK  12–18  České Budějovice
Standings (after 2 matches): Scaldis 6 points, České Budějovice, Szentendre 3, CC Oeiras 0.
Group B:
Trojans KC  26–21  KV Adler Rauxel
Koog Zaandijk  36–9  CK Vacarisses
Standings (after 2 matches): Koog Zaandijk, Trojans 6 points, Vacarisses, Adler Rauxel 0.

Rugby union
Amlin Challenge Cup pool stage, matchday 6 (team in bold advances to the knockout stages):
Pool 5:
Gloucester  60–7  Agen
La Rochelle  71–17  Rovigo
Final standings: La Rochelle 24 points, Gloucester 21, Agen 15, Rovigo 0.

Snowboarding
World Championships in La Molina, Spain:
Men's halfpipe:  Nathan Johnstone  26.8 points  Yuri Podladchikov  26.2  Markus Malin  24.3
Johnstone wins his first world title.
Women's halfpipe:  Holly Crawford  26.7 points  Ursina Haller  23.4  Liu Jiayu  22.5
Crawford wins her first world title.

Tennis
Australian Open in Melbourne, Australia, day 4:
Men's Singles – 2nd Round:
Rafael Nadal  [1] def. Ryan Sweeting  6–2, 6–1, 6–1
Robin Söderling  [4] def. Gilles Müller  6–3, 7–6(1), 6–1
Andy Murray  [5] def. Illya Marchenko  6–1, 6–3, 6–3
David Ferrer  [7] def. Michael Russell  6–0, 6–1, 7–5
Mikhail Youzhny  [10] def. Blaž Kavčič  6–3, 6–1, 5–7, 4–6, 6–1
Women's Singles – 2nd Round:
Vera Zvonareva  [2] def. Bojana Jovanovski  2–6, 6–3, 6–1
Kim Clijsters  [3] def. Carla Suárez Navarro  6–1, 6–3
Samantha Stosur  [5] def. Vera Dushevina  6–3, 6–2
Peng Shuai  def. Jelena Janković  [7] 7–6(3), 6–3
Shahar Pe'er  [10] def. Sorana Cîrstea  6–3, 6–2

January 19, 2011 (Wednesday)

Basketball
Euroleague Top 16, matchday 1:
Group E: Lietuvos Rytas  59–80  Panathinaikos Athens
Group G:
Efes Pilsen Istanbul  60–58  Montepaschi Siena
Real Madrid  78–58  Partizan Belgrade
Group H: Power Electronics Valencia  73–59  Žalgiris Kaunas

Cricket
Pakistan in New Zealand:
2nd Test in Wellington, day 5:  356 & 293;  376 & 226/5 (92 overs). Match drawn; Pakistan win 2-match series 1–0.

Cycling
UCI World Tour:
Tour Down Under in Australia:
Stage 2, Tailem Bend to Mannum, :  Ben Swift  3h 27' 44"  Robbie McEwen  s.t.  Graeme Brown  s.t.
Overall standings: (1) McEwen  6h 44' 42" (2) Matthew Goss   + 0" (3) Swift + 0"

Football (soccer)
AFC Asian Cup in Qatar: (teams in bold advance to the quarterfinals)
Group D:
 1–0 
 0–3 
Final standings: Iran 9 points, Iraq 6, North Korea, United Arab Emirates 1.
South American Youth Championship in Peru:
Group A:
 1–2 
 1–1 
Standings: Argentina 6 points (2 matches),  3 (1), Venezuela 1 (1), Uruguay 1 (2), Peru 0 (2).
OFC U-17 Championship in Albany, North Shore City, New Zealand:
3rd place:  0–2  
Final:   2–0  
New Zealand win the tournament for the third successive time and fourth time overall, and qualifies for the FIFA U-17 World Cup.

Handball
World Men's Championship in Sweden: (teams in bold advance to the main round)
Group A:
 21–28 
 23–30 
 31–18 
Standings (after 4 games): France, Spain 8 points, Germany 4, Tunisia, Egypt 2, Bahrain 0.
Group C:
 24–24 
 26–19 
 14–29 
Standings (after 4 games): Denmark 8 points, Croatia 7, Serbia 5, Romania, Algeria 2, Australia 0.

Korfball
Europa Cup in Budapest, Hungary:
Group A:
Szentendre KK  16–14  CC Oeiras
R Scaldis SC  37–17  České Budějovice
Group B:
Koog Zaandijk  27–13  KV Adler Rauxel
CK Vacarisses  17–19  Trojans KC

Snowboarding
World Championships in La Molina, Spain:
Parallel Giant Slalom men:  Benjamin Karl   Rok Marguč   Roland Fischnaller 
Karl wins his first world title.
Parallel Giant Slalom women:  Alena Zavarzina   Claudia Riegler   Doris Günther 
Zavarzina wins her first world title.

Tennis
Australian Open in Melbourne, Australia, day 3:
Men's Singles – 2nd Round:
Roger Federer  [2] def. Gilles Simon  6–2, 6–3, 4–6, 4–6, 6–3
Novak Djokovic  [3] def. Ivan Dodig  7–5, 6–7(8), 6–0, 6–2
Tomáš Berdych  [6] def. Philipp Kohlschreiber  4–6, 6–2, 6–3, 6–4
Andy Roddick  [8] def. Igor Kunitsyn  7–6(7), 6–2, 6–3
Fernando Verdasco  [9] def. Janko Tipsarević  2–6, 4–6, 6–4, 7–6(0), 6–0
Women's Singles – 2nd Round:
Caroline Wozniacki  [1] def. Vania King  6–1, 6–0
Venus Williams  [4] def. Sandra Záhlavová  6–7(6), 6–0, 6–4
Francesca Schiavone  [6] def. Rebecca Marino  6–3, 5–7, 9–7
Victoria Azarenka  [8] def. Andrea Hlaváčková  6–4, 6–4
Li Na  [9] def. Evgeniya Rodina  6–3, 6–2

January 18, 2011 (Tuesday)

Cricket
Pakistan in New Zealand:
2nd Test in Wellington, day 4:  356 & 293 (90.5 overs);  376. New Zealand lead by 273 runs.
India in South Africa:
3rd ODI in Cape Town:  220 (49.2 overs);  223/8 (48.2 overs). India win by 2 wickets; lead 5-match series 2–1.

Cycling
UCI World Tour:
Tour Down Under in Australia:
Stage 1, Mawson Lakes to Angaston, :  Matthew Goss  3h 17' 08"  André Greipel  s.t.  Robbie McEwen  s.t.
Overall standings: (1) Goss  3h 16' 58" (2) Greipel + 4" (3) McEwen + 6"

Football (soccer)
AFC Asian Cup in Qatar: (teams in bold advance to the quarterfinals)
Group C:
 4–1 
 1–0 
Final standings: Australia, South Korea 7 points, Bahrain 3, India 0.
Central American Cup in Panama: (teams in bold advance to the semifinals and qualify for CONCACAF Gold Cup)
Group A:
 1–1 
 2–0 
Final standings: Panama 9 points, El Salvador 6, Nicaragua, Belize 1.
Group B:  3–1 
Final standings: Honduras,  4 points, Guatemala 0.

Handball
World Men's Championship in Sweden: (teams in bold advance to main round)
Group B:
 24–28 
 26–25 
 23–26 
Standings (after 4 games): Iceland 8 points, Hungary, Norway 6, Austria, Japan 2, Brazil 0.
Group D:
 29–29 
 20–25 
 22–27 
Standings (after 4 games): Poland 8 points, Sweden 6, Argentina 5, South Korea 3, Slovakia, Chile 1.

Snowboarding
World Championships in La Molina, Spain:
Men's snowboard cross:  Alex Pullin   Seth Wescott   Nate Holland 
Pullin becomes the first Australian world champion.
Women's snowboard cross:  Lindsey Jacobellis   Nelly Moenne Loccoz   Dominique Maltais 
Jacobellis wins the title for the third time.

Tennis
Australian Open in Melbourne, Australia, day 2:
Men's Singles – 1st Round:
Rafael Nadal  [1] def. Marcos Daniel  6–0, 5–0 retired
Robin Söderling  [4] def. Potito Starace  6–4, 6–2, 6–2
Andy Murray  [5] def. Karol Beck  6–3, 6–1, 4–2 retired
David Ferrer  [7] def. Jarkko Nieminen  6–4, 6–3, 1–6, 6–2
Mikhail Youzhny  [10] def. Marsel İlhan  6–2, 6–3, 7–6(5)
Women's Singles – 1st Round:
Vera Zvonareva  [2] def. Sybille Bammer  6–2, 6–1
Kim Clijsters  [3] def. Dinara Safina  6–0, 6–0
Samantha Stosur  [5] def. Lauren Davis  6–1, 6–1
Jelena Janković  [7] def. Alla Kudryavtseva  6–0, 7–6(5)
Shahar Pe'er  [10] def. Mathilde Johansson  6–1, 6–1

January 17, 2011 (Monday)

Cricket
Pakistan in New Zealand:
2nd Test in Wellington, day 3:  356 & 9/0 (5 overs);  376 (133 overs). New Zealand trail by 11 runs with 10 wickets remaining.

Football (soccer)
AFC Asian Cup in Qatar: (teams in bold advance to the quarterfinals)
Group B:
 0–5 
 2–1 
Final standings: Japan, Jordan 7 points, Syria 3, Saudi Arabia 0.
South American Youth Championship in Peru:
Group B:
 1–1 
 4–2

Handball
World Men's Championship in Sweden: (teams in bold advance to the main round)
Group A:
 26–24 
 41–17 
 23–27 
Standings (after 3 games): France, Spain 6 points, Germany 4, Egypt 2, Tunisia, Bahrain 0.
Group B:
 36–24 
 33–27 
 36–22 
Standings (after 3 games): Iceland 6 points, Norway, Hungary 4, Japan, Austria 2, Brazil 0.
Group C:
 42–15 
 14–15 
 35–27 
Standings (after 3 games): Denmark, Croatia 6 points, Serbia 4, Algeria 2, Romania, Australia 0.
Group D:
 18–23 
 38–23 
 30–24 
Standings (after 3 games): Sweden, Poland 6 points, South Korea, Argentina 3, Slovakia, Chile 0.

Tennis
Australian Open in Melbourne, Australia, day 1:
Men's Singles – 1st Round:
Roger Federer  [2] def. Lukáš Lacko  6–1, 6–1, 6–3
Novak Djokovic  [3] def. Marcel Granollers  6–1, 6–3, 6–1
Tomáš Berdych  [6] def. Marco Crugnola  6–4, 6–0, 6–2
Andy Roddick  [8] def. Jan Hájek  6–1, 6–2, 6–2
Fernando Verdasco  [9] def. Rainer Schüttler  6–1, 6–3, 6–2
Women's Singles – 1st Round:
Caroline Wozniacki  [1] def. Gisela Dulko  6–3, 6–4
Venus Williams  [4] def. Sara Errani  6–3, 6–2
Francesca Schiavone  [6] def. Arantxa Parra Santonja  6–7(4), 6–2, 6–4
Victoria Azarenka  [8] def. Kathrin Wörle  6–0, 6–2
Li Na  [9] def. Sofia Arvidsson  6–1, 7–5

January 16, 2011 (Sunday)

Alpine skiing
Men's World Cup in Wengen, Switzerland:
Slalom:  Ivica Kostelić  1:45.28 (52.46 / 52.82)  Marcel Hirscher  1:46.21 (52.37/ 53.84)  Jean-Baptiste Grange  1:46.27 (52.49 / 53.78)
Slalom standings (after 5 of 10 races): (1) Kostelić 353 points (2) Hirscher 276 (3) André Myhrer  213
Overall standings (after 18 of 38 races): (1) Kostelić 726 points (2) Aksel Lund Svindal  511 (3) Silvan Zurbriggen  469
Women's World Cup in Maribor, Slovenia:
Slalom: Cancelled due to warm weather.

American football
NFL playoffs – Divisional Playoffs:
NFC: Chicago Bears 35, Seattle Seahawks 24
AFC: New York Jets 28, New England Patriots 21

Auto racing
Dakar Rally in Argentina and Chile:
Motorcycles:  Marc Coma  (KTM) 51h 25' 00"  Cyril Despres  (KTM) 51h 40' 04"  Hélder Rodrigues  (Yamaha) 53h 05' 20"
Coma wins the event for the third time.
Cars:  Nasser Al-Attiyah /Timo Gottschalk  (Volkswagen) 45h 16' 16"  Giniel de Villiers /Dirk Von Zitzewitz (Volkswagen) 46h 05' 57"  Carlos Sainz /Lucas Cruz  (Volkswagen) 46h 36' 54"
Al-Attiyah wins the event for the first time.
Trucks:  Vladimir Chagin /Sergey Savostin /Ildar Shaysultanov  (KamAZ) 48h 28' 54"  Firdaus Kabirov /Aydar Belyaev /Andrey Mokeev  (KamAZ) 48h 58' 58"  Eduard Nikolaev /Viatcheslav Mizyukaev /Vladimir Rybakov  (KamAZ) 51h 49' 11"
Chagin wins the event for a record seventh time.
All-terrain vehicles:  Alejandro Patronelli  (Yamaha) 63h 49' 47"  Sebastian Halpern  (Yamaha) 64h 49' 40"  Łukasz Łaskawiec  (Yamaha) 70h 07' 25"
Patronelli wins the event for the first time, matching brother Marcos' feat from 2010.

Basketball
 BBL Cup Final in Birmingham, England:
Mersey Tigers 66–93 Sheffield Sharks
Sheffield win the Cup for the second successive season, and third time overall.

Biathlon
World Cup 5 in Ruhpolding, Germany:
Men's 12.5 km Pursuit:  Björn Ferry  31:56.6 (0+0+0+0)  Martin Fourcade  32:01.5 (0+1+1+0)  Michael Greis  32:03.5 (0+0+0+0)
Pursuit standings (after 3 of 7 races): (1) Tarjei Bø  146 points (2) Emil Hegle Svendsen  130 (3) Fourcade 122
Overall standings (after 12 of 26 races): (1) Bø 572 points (2) Svendsen 533 (3) Fourcade 397
Women's 10 km Pursuit:  Tora Berger  28:50.9 (0+0+0+1)  Andrea Henkel  29:28.6 (0+0+1+1)  Kaisa Mäkäräinen  29:50.2 (2+0+0+0)
Pursuit standings (after 3 of 7 races): (1) Mäkäräinen 162 points (2) Helena Ekholm  146 (3) Anna Carin Olofsson-Zidek  126
Overall standings (after 12 of 26 races): (1) Mäkäräinen 541 points (2) Ekholm 499 (3) Henkel 454

Bobsleigh
World Cup in Igls, Austria:
Four-man:  Manuel Machata/Richard Adjei/Andreas Bredau/Christian Poser  1:42.92 (51.47 / 51.45)  Thomas Florschütz/Ronny Listner/Kevin Kuske/Andreas Barucha  1:42.97 (51.52 / 51.45)  Steve Holcomb/Justin Olsen/Steven Langton/Curtis Tomasevicz  1:43.02 (51.47 / 51.55)
Standings (after 5 of 8 races): (1) Machata 1036 points (2) Holcomb 1010 (3) Karl Angerer  922

Cricket
Pakistan in New Zealand:
2nd Test in Wellington, day 2:  356 (127.1 overs; Daniel Vettori 110);  134/2 (49.5 overs). Pakistan trail by 222 runs with 8 wickets remaining in the 1st innings.
England in Australia:
1st ODI in Melbourne:  294 (49.4 overs);  297/4 (49.1 overs; Shane Watson 161*). Australia win by 6 wickets; lead 7-match series 1–0.

Cross-country skiing
World Cup in Liberec, Czech Republic:
Men's Team Sprint Classic:   I (Johan Kjølstad, Ola Vigen Hattestad) 21:47.1   I (Jesper Modin, Mats Larsson) 21:51.5   II (Eirik Brandsdal, John Kristian Dahl) 21:55.2
Women's Team Sprint Classic:   I (Maiken Caspersen Falla, Marit Bjørgen) 19:30.8   I (Magda Genuin, Marianna Longa) 20:01.3   II (Kari Vikhagen Gjeitnes, Celine Brun-Lie) 20:14.4

Football (soccer)
AFC Asian Cup in Qatar: (teams in bold advance to the quarterfinals)
Group A:
 3–0 
 2–2 
Final standings: Uzbekistan 7 points, Qatar 6, China 4, Kuwait 0.
Central American Cup in Panama: (teams in bold advance to the semifinals and qualify for CONCACAF Gold Cup)
Group A:
 2–5 
 2–0 
Standings (after 2 matches): El Salvador, Panama 6 points, Nicaragua, Belize 0.
Group B:  0–2 
Standings: Costa Rica 4 points (2 matches),  1 (1), Guatemala 0 (1).
South American Youth Championship in Peru:
Group A:
 2–1 
 0–2

Freestyle skiing
World Cup in Les Contamines-Montjoie, France:
Ski Cross men:  Christopher Del Bosco   Andreas Matt   Egor Korotkov 
Ski Cross standings (after 5 of 11 events): (1) Matt 319 points (2) Del Bosco 225 (3) Alex Fiva  199
Ski Cross women:  Ophélie David   Kelsey Serwa   Anna Holmlund 
Ski Cross standings (after 5 of 11 events): (1) Serwa 329 points (2) Heidi Zacher  296 (3) Fanny Smith  255
World Cup in Mont Gabriel, Canada:
Aerials men:  Anton Kushnir  247.60 points  Qi Guangpu  240.97  Stanislav Kravchuk  234.60
Aerials standings (after 3 of 8 events): (1) Jia Zongyang  220 points (2) Qi 216 (3) Kushnir 168
Overall standings: (1) Andreas Matt  64 points (2) Guilbaut Colas  60 (3) Mikaël Kingsbury  55
Aerials women:  Xu Mengtao  192.28 points  Alla Tsuper  187.00  Cheng Shuang  186.99
Aerials standings (after 3 of 8 events): (1) Xu 280 points (2) Cheng 200 (3) Zhang Xin  162
Overall standings: (1) Kelsey Serwa  66 points (2) Hannah Kearney  62 (3) Heidi Zacher  59

Golf
PGA Tour:
Sony Open in Hawaii in Honolulu, Hawaii:
Winner: Mark Wilson  264 (−16)
Wilson wins his third PGA Tour title.
European Tour:
Joburg Open in Johannesburg, South Africa:
Winner: Charl Schwartzel  265 (−19)
Schwartzel defends his title, and wins his sixth European Tour title.

Handball
World Men's Championship in Sweden:
Group A:
 18–38 
 18–21 
 19–28 
Standings (after 2 games): Germany, France, Spain 4 points, Egypt, Tunisia, Bahrain 0.
Group C:
 18–35 
 15–26 
 30–39 
Standings (after 2 games): Denmark, Serbia, Croatia 4 points, Algeria, Romania, Australia 0.

Luge
World Cup in Oberhof, Germany:
Women:  Tatjana Hüfner  1:26.366 (43.239 / 43.127)  Natalie Geisenberger  1:26.775 (43.491 / 43.284)  Anke Wischnewski  1:27.298 (43.677 / 43.621)
Standings (after 6 of 9 events): (1) Hüfner 585 points (2) Geisenberger 475 (3) Wischnewski 415
Hüfner wins her fifth race of the season.
Team relay:   (Tatjana Hüfner/Felix Loch/Tobias Wendl/Tobias Arlt) 2:27.306 (47.906 / 49.468 / 49.932)   (Tatiana Ivanova/Viktor Kneib/Vladislav Yuzhakov/Vladimir Makhnutin) 2:28.714 (48.785 / 49.837 / 50.092)   (Sandra Gasparini/David Mair/Christian Oberstolz/Patrick Gruber) 2:29.047 (49.153 / 49.962 / 49.932)
Standings (after 4 of 6 events): (1) Germany 400 points (2) Italy 295 (3)  256

Nordic combined
World Cup in Seefeld, Austria:
HS 106 / 10 km:  Magnus Moan  24:36.8  Jason Lamy-Chappuis  24:38.4  David Kreiner  24:39.4
Standings (after 9 of 13 races): (1) Lamy-Chappuis 639 points (2) Mikko Kokslien  469 (3) Mario Stecher  466

Rugby union
Heineken Cup pool stage, matchday 5 (teams in bold advance to the knockout stage):
Pool 3:
London Irish  24–12  Ospreys
Toulon  32–16  Munster
Standings (after 5 matches): Toulon 17 points, Munster 11, Ospreys 10, London Irish 9.
Munster fail to reach the quarter-final stage of the competition for the first time since 1997–98.
Pool 6: Glasgow Warriors  20–10  London Wasps
Standings (after 5 matches):  Toulouse 21 points, London Wasps 15, Glasgow Warriors 8,  Newport Gwent Dragons 1.
Amlin Challenge Cup pool stage, matchday 5 (team in bold advances to the knockout stage):
Pool 4: Stade Français  39–10  Leeds Carnegie
Standings (after 5 matches): Stade Français 24 points, Leeds Carnegie 14,  București Oaks,  Crociati Parma 5.

Short track speed skating
European Championships in Heerenveen, Netherlands:
Men:  Thibaut Fauconnet  136 points  Haralds Silovs  50  Sjinkie Knegt  47
Fauconnet wins the title for the first time, and becomes the first French champion in 10 years.
Women:  Arianna Fontana  115 points  Bernadett Heidum  42  Martina Valcepina  39
Fontana wins her third title in four years.
Men's 5000 m relay:   6:54.608   6:54.726   6:56.025
Women's 3000 m relay:   4:19.253   4:19.284   4:20.473

Ski jumping
World Cup in Sapporo, Japan:
HS 134:  Andreas Kofler  232.9 points  Severin Freund  224.7  Thomas Morgenstern  222.4
Standings (after 15 of 26 events): (1) Morgenstern 1223 points (2) Kofler 771 (3) Simon Ammann  753

Snooker
Masters in London, England
Final: Ding Junhui  [9] 10–4 Marco Fu  [16]
Ding wins his seventh professional title.
This is the first All-Asian final.

January 15, 2011 (Saturday)

Alpine skiing
Men's World Cup in Wengen, Switzerland:
Downhill:  Klaus Kröll  2:31.28  Didier Cuche  2:31.42  Carlo Janka  2:31.67
Downhill standings (after 4 of 9 races): (1) Michael Walchhofer  269 points (2) Silvan Zurbriggen  250 (3) Kröll 190
Overall standings (after 17 of 38 races): (1) Ivica Kostelić  626 points (2) Aksel Lund Svindal  511 (3) Zurbriggen 459
Women's World Cup in Maribor, Slovenia:
Giant slalom: Cancelled during 1st run due to warm weather.

American football
NFL playoffs – Divisional Playoffs:
AFC: Pittsburgh Steelers 31, Baltimore Ravens 24
NFC: Green Bay Packers 48, Atlanta Falcons 21

Biathlon
World Cup 5 in Ruhpolding, Germany:
Women's 7.5 km Sprint:  Tora Berger  20:33.3 (0+0)  Andrea Henkel  20:34.4 (0+0)  Magdalena Neuner  20:49.1 (0+1)
Standings (after 5 of 10 races): (1) Kaisa Mäkäräinen  230 points (2) Neuner 198 (3) Darya Domracheva  192
Overall standings (after 11 of 26 races): (1) Mäkäräinen 493 points (2) Helena Ekholm  461 (3) Henkel 400

Bobsleigh
World Cup in Igls, Austria:
Two-man:  Beat Hefti/Thomas Lamparter  1:44.31 (52.21 / 52.10)  Alexandr Zubkov/Alexey Voyevoda  1:44.54 (52.30 / 52.24)  Simone Bertazzo/Matteo Torchio  1:44.97 (52.56 / 52.41)
Standings (after 5 of 8 races): (1) Zubkov 1013 points (2) Manuel Machata  1003 (3) Bertazzo 947
Team:   (John Fairbairn, Helen Upperton/Diane Kelly, Darla Deschamps, Lyndon Rush/Cody Sorensen) 3:37.09 (54.23 / 54.61 / 55.29 / 52.96)   (Matthias Guggenberger, Christina Hengster/Anna Feichtner, Janine Flock, Jürgen Loacker/Johannes Wipplinger) 3:37.13 (53.94 / 54.35 / 55.83 / 53.01)   (Aleksandr Tretyakov, Olga Fyodorova/Yulia Timofeeva, Olga Potelicina, Alexander Kasjanov/Alexander Shilkin) 3:37.56 (53.92 / 54.65 / 55.51 / 53.48)

Cricket
Pakistan in New Zealand:
2nd Test in Wellington, day 1:  246/6 (90 overs); .
India in South Africa:
2nd ODI in Johannesburg:  190 (47.2 overs);  189 (43 overs). India win by 1 run; 5-match series tied 1–1.

Cross-country skiing
World Cup in Liberec, Czech Republic:
Men's Sprint Freestyle:  Ola Vigen Hattestad  2:55.3  Federico Pellegrino  2:56.3  Dušan Kožíšek  2:58.3
Sprint standings (after 6 of 11 races): (1) Emil Jönsson  280 points (2) Hattestad 184 (3) Jesper Modin  & Fulvio Scola  180
Overall standings (after 19 of 31 races): (1) Dario Cologna  1197 points (2) Petter Northug  706 (3) Lukáš Bauer  698
Women's Sprint Freestyle:  Kikkan Randall  2:37.6  Hanna Falk  2:38.1  Celine Brun-Lie  2:38.2
Sprint standings (after 6 of 11 races): (1) Randall 291 points (2) Arianna Follis  288 (3) Petra Majdič  254
Overall standings (after 19 of 31 races): (1) Justyna Kowalczyk  1271 points (2) Follis 880 (3) Marit Bjørgen  796

Football (soccer)
AFC Asian Cup in Qatar: (teams in bold advance to the quarterfinals)
Group D:
 1–0 
 0–1 
Standings (after 2 matches): Iran 6 points, Iraq 3, United Arab Emirates, North Korea 1.
OFC Champions League Group stage, matchday 3:
Group A: Lautoka  0–0  PRK Hekari United
Standings (after 3 matches): Lautoka 7 points,  Amicale 6, PRK Hekari United 4,  Koloale 0.

Freestyle skiing
World Cup in Mont Gabriel, Canada:
Dual Moguls men:  Alexandre Bilodeau  21.00 points  Mikaël Kingsbury  14.00  Guilbaut Colas  21.00
Moguls standings (after 4 of 11 events): (1) Colas 300 points (2) Kingsbury 275 (3) Patrick Deneen  247
Overall standings: (1) Colas 60 points (2) Kingsbury 55 (3) Deneen 49
Dual Moguls women:  Justine Dufour-Lapointe  22.00  Anastassia Gunchenko  13.00  Jennifer Heil  21.00
Moguls standings (after 4 of 11 events): (1) Hannah Kearney  309 points (2) Heil 260 (3) Dufour-Lapointe 205
Overall standings: (1) Kearney 62 points (2) Heil & Heidi Zacher  52

Handball
World Men's Championship in Sweden:
Group B:
 26–23 
 33–30 
 26–34 
Standings (after 2 games): Iceland 4 points, Austria, Norway, Japan, Hungary 2, Brazil 0.
Group D:
 22–37 
 22–38 
 23–24 
Standings (after 2 games): Sweden, Poland 4 points, South Korea 3, Argentina 1, Slovakia, Chile 0.

Luge
World Cup in Oberhof, Germany:
Doubles:  Tobias Wendl/Tobias Arlt  1:26.794 (43.386 / 43.408)  Christian Oberstolz/Patrick Gruber  1:26.833 (43.355 / 43.478)  Toni Eggert/Sascha Benecken  1:26.988 (43.624 / 43.364)
Standings (after 6 of 9 events): (1) Wendl/Arlt 530 points (2) Oberstolz/Gruber 485 (3) Andreas Linger/Wolfgang Linger  392
Wendl/Arlt win their fourth race of the season.
Men's singles:  Felix Loch  1:30.883 (45.543 / 45.340)  Andi Langenhan  1:31.115 (45.523 / 45.592)  David Möller  1:31.326 (45.821 / 45.505)
Standings (after 6 of 9 events): (1) Armin Zöggeler  525 points (2) Loch 445 (3) Möller 394

Nordic combined
World Cup in Seefeld, Austria:
HS 106 / 10 km:  Jason Lamy-Chappuis  25:33.2  Magnus Moan  26:02.5  Mikko Kokslien  26:06.1
Standings (after 8 of 13 races): (1) Lamy-Chappuis 559 points (2) Mario Stecher  466 (3) Kokslien 447

Rugby union
Heineken Cup pool stage, matchday 5 (team in bold advances to the knockout stages, teams in strike are eliminated):
Pool 2: Leinster  43–20  Saracens
Standings (after 5 matches): Leinster 19 points,  Clermont 14,  Racing Métro 9, Saracens 6.
Pool 4:
Bath  55–16  Aironi
Ulster  9–6  Biarritz
Standings (after 5 matches): Biarritz 17 points (6–4 in head-to head competition points), Ulster 17 (4–6), Bath 13, Aironi 4.
Pool 5:
Benetton Treviso  9–44  Perpignan
Scarlets  18–32  Leicester Tigers
Standings (after 5 matches): Perpignan 17 points (6–3 in head-to head competition points), Leicester Tigers 17 (3–6), Scarlets 15, Benetton Treviso 1.
Pool 6: Toulouse  17–3  Newport Gwent Dragons
Standings: Toulouse 21 points (5 matches),  London Wasps 15 (4),  Glasgow Warriors 4 (4), Newport Gwent Dragons 1 (5).
Amlin Challenge Cup pool stage, matchday 5: (teams in strike are eliminated)
Pool 1:
Cavalieri Prato  16–48  Harlequins
Bayonne  21–35  Connacht
Standings (after 5 matches): Harlequins 19 points, Bayonne 15, Connacht 10, Cavalieri Prato 4.
Pool 3: Exeter Chiefs  17–6  Bourgoin
Standings (after 5 matches):  Montpellier 17 points, Exeter Chiefs 15,  Newcastle Falcons 9, Bourgoin 6.
Pool 4: Crociati Parma  16–12  București Oaks
Standings:  Stade Français 19 points (4 matches),  Leeds Carnegie 14 (4), București Oaks, Crociati Parma 5 (5).
Pool 5:  Rovigo 7–55  Gloucester
Standings (after 5 matches):  La Rochelle 19 points, Gloucester 16,  Agen 15, Rovigo 0.

Skeleton
World Cup in Igls, Austria:
Men:  Martins Dukurs   1:45.95 (52.95 / 53.00)  Sergey Chudinov  1:46.75 (53.41 / 53.34)  Aleksandr Tretyakov  1:46.89 (53.55 / 53.34)
Standings (after 5 of 8 events): (1) Dukurs 1044 points (2) Tretyakov 955 (3) Sandro Stielicke  906
Team:   (John Fairbairn, Helen Upperton/Diane Kelly, Darla Deschamps, Lyndon Rush/Cody Sorensen) 3:37.09 (54.23 / 54.61 / 55.29 / 52.96)   (Matthias Guggenberger, Christina Hengster/Anna Feichtner, Janine Flock, Jürgen Loacker/Johannes Wipplinger) 3:37.13 (53.94 / 54.35 / 55.83 / 53.01)   (Aleksandr Tretyakov, Olga Fyodorova/Yulia Timofeeva, Olga Potelicina, Alexander Kasjanov/Alexander Shilkin) 3:37.56 (53.92 / 54.65 / 55.51 / 53.48)

Ski jumping
World Cup in Sapporo, Japan:
HS 134:  Severin Freund  249.6 points  Thomas Morgenstern  248.2  Adam Małysz  240.5
Standings (after 14 of 26 events): (1) Morgenstern 1163 points (2) Simon Ammann  721 (3) Andreas Kofler  671

Snooker
Masters in London, England, Semi-finals:
Marco Fu  [16] 6–4 Mark Allen  [12]
Jamie Cope  [14] 3–6 Ding Junhui  [9]

Snowboarding
World Championships in Barcelona, Spain:
Men's big air:  Petja Piiroinen  51.7 points  Zachary Stone  48.9  Seppe Smits  48.9

Tennis
ATP World Tour:
Medibank International Sydney:
Final: Gilles Simon  def. Viktor Troicki  7–5, 7–6(4)
Simon wins the eighth title of his career.
Heineken Open in Auckland, New Zealand:
Final: David Ferrer  def. David Nalbandian  6–3, 6–2
Ferrer wins the tenth title of his career.
WTA Tour:
Moorilla Hobart International:
Final: Jarmila Groth  def. Bethanie Mattek-Sands  6–4, 6–3
Groth wins the second title of her career.
Exhibition tournament:
AAMI Classic in Melbourne, Australia:
Final: Lleyton Hewitt  def. Gaël Monfils  7–5, 6–3
Hewitt wins the event for the first time.

January 14, 2011 (Friday)

Alpine skiing
Men's World Cup in Wengen, Switzerland:
Super combined:  Ivica Kostelić  2:40.44  Carlo Janka  2:41.02  Aksel Lund Svindal  2:41.78
Overall standings (after 16 of 38 races): (1) Kostelić 604 points (2) Svindal 495 (3) Silvan Zurbriggen  439

Biathlon
World Cup 5 in Ruhpolding, Germany:
Men's 10 km Sprint:  Lars Berger  23:55.1 (0+0)  Martin Fourcade  24:16.8 (0+0)  Ivan Tcherezov  24:18.9 (0+0)
Sprint standings (after 5 of 10 races): (1) Tarjei Bø  254 points (2) Emil Hegle Svendsen  204 (3) Michael Greis  168
Overall standings (after 11 of 26 races): (1) Bø 529 points (2) Svendsen 497 (3) Ole Einar Bjørndalen  362

Bobsleigh
World Cup in Igls, Austria:
Women:  Shauna Rohbock/Valerie Fleming  1:48.50 (54.45 / 54.05)  Anja Schneiderheinze-Stöckel/Christin Senkel  1:48.59 (54.43 / 54.16)  Fabienne Meyer/Hanne Schenk  1:48.70 (54.36 / 54.34)
Standings (after 5 of 8 races): (1) Sandra Kiriasis  1061 points (2) Cathleen Martini  1003 (3) Meyer 896

Cricket
England in Australia:
2nd T20I in Melbourne:  147/7 (20 overs);  143/6 (20 overs). Australia win by 4 runs; 2-match series drawn 1–1.

Football (soccer)
AFC Asian Cup in Qatar: (teams in strike are eliminated)
Group C:
 1–1 
 5–2 
Standings (after 2 matches): Australia, South Korea 4 points, Bahrain 3, India 0.
Central American Cup in Panama:
Group A:
 2–0 
 2–0 
Group B:  1–1

Handball
World Men's Championship in Sweden:
Group A:
 32–19 
 30–25 
 33–22 
Group B:
 32–26 
 35–29 
 34–24 
Group C:
 27–21 
 47–12 
 25–24 
Group D:
 25–25 
 35–33

Nordic combined
World Cup in Seefeld, Austria:
HS 106 / 4 x 5 km:   (Magnus Moan, Håvard Klemetsen, Jan Schmid, Mikko Kokslien) 47:31.2   (Felix Gottwald, Wilhelm Denifl, David Kreiner, Bernhard Gruber) 47:43.1   (François Braud, Maxime Laheurte, Sébastien Lacroix, Jason Lamy-Chappuis) 48:19.1

Rugby union
Heineken Cup pool stage, matchday 5 (team in bold advances to the knockout stage):
Pool 1:
Cardiff Blues  14–9  Castres
Northampton Saints  37–0  Edinburgh
Standings (after 5 matches): Northampton Saints 21 points, Castres 11, Cardiff Blues 10, Edinburgh 7.
Pool 2: Clermont  28–17  Racing Métro
Standings:  Leinster 14 points (4 matches), Clermont 14 (5), Racing Métro 9 (5),  Saracens 6 (4).
Amlin Challenge Cup pool stage, matchday 5 (team in bold advances to the knockout stage; teams in strike are eliminated):
Pool 2:
Brive  52–3  El Salvador
Sale Sharks  54–0  Petrarca Padova
Standings (after 5 matches): Brive 23 points, Sale Sharks 16, Petrarca Padova 5, El Salvador 4.
Pool 3: Newcastle Falcons  0–6  Montpellier
Standings: Montpellier 17 points (5 matches),  Exeter Chiefs 11 (4), Newcastle Falcons 9 (5),  Bourgoin 6 (4).

Skeleton
World Cup in Igls, Austria:
Women:  Anja Huber  1:51.10 (55.34 / 55.76)  Shelley Rudman  1:51.27 (55.69 / 55.58)  Mellisa Hollingsworth  1:51.45 (55.70 / 55.75)
Standings (after 5 of 8 events): (1) Huber 1075 points (2) Rudman 1024 (3) Hollingsworth 978

Snooker
Masters in London, England, Quarter-finals:
Mark Allen  [12] 6–4 Neil Robertson  [2]
Peter Ebdon  [13] 0–6 Marco Fu  [16]

Tennis
WTA Tour:
Medibank International Sydney in Sydney, Australia:
Final: Li Na  def. Kim Clijsters  7–6(3), 6–3
Li wins the 4th title of her career.

January 13, 2011 (Thursday)

Biathlon
World Cup 5 in Ruhpolding, Germany:
Women's 15 km Individual:  Olga Zaitseva  41:46.1 (0+0+0+0)  Andrea Henkel  42:00.6 (0+0+0+0)  Helena Ekholm  42:23.5 (0+0+0+0)
Individual standings (after 3 of 4 races): (1) Zaitseva 138 points (2) Marie-Laure Brunet  132 (3) Valj Semerenko  129
Overall standings (after 10 of 26 races): (1) Kaisa Mäkäräinen  459 points (2) Ekholm 429 (3) Brunet 354

Football (soccer)
AFC Asian Cup in Qatar: (teams in strike are eliminated)
Group B:
 1–0 
 1–2 
Standings (after 2 matches): Japan, Jordan 4 points, Syria 3, Saudi Arabia 0.

Handball
World Men's Championship in Sweden:
Group D:  28–18

Rugby union
Amlin Challenge Cup pool stage, matchday 5: (teams in strike are eliminated)
Pool 5: Agen  17–28  La Rochelle
Standings: La Rochelle 19 points (5 matches), Agen 15 (5),  Gloucester 11 (4),  Rovigo 0 (4).

Snooker
Masters in London, England, Quarter-finals:
Ding Junhui  [9] 6–2 Graeme Dott  [11]
Mark King  [15] 1–6 Jamie Cope  [14]

January 12, 2011 (Wednesday)

Biathlon
World Cup 5 in Ruhpolding, Germany:
Men's 20 km Individual:  Emil Hegle Svendsen  50:39.4 (0+0+0+1)  Martin Fourcade  50:46.8 (0+0+0+1)  Dominik Landertinger  51:03.1 (0+0+0+1)
Individual standings (after 3 of 4 races): (1) Svendsen 145 points (2) Tarjei Bø  112 (3) Daniel Mesotitsch  109
Overall standings (after 10 of 26 races): (1) Bø 489 points (2) Svendsen 454 (3) Ole Einar Bjørndalen  338

Cricket
India in South Africa:
1st ODI in Durban:  289/9 (50 overs);  154 (35.4 overs). South Africa win by 135 runs; lead 5-match series 1–0.
England in Australia:
1st T20I in Adelaide:  157/4 (20 overs);  158/9 (20 overs). England win by 1 wicket; lead 2-match series 1–0.
England produce a record eighth win in a row in Twenty20 Internationals.

Football (soccer)
AFC Asian Cup in Qatar:
Group A:
 2–1 
 0–2 
Standings (after 2 matches): Uzbekistan 6 points, China, Qatar 3, Kuwait 0.

Freestyle skiing
World Cup in Alpe d'Huez, France:
Ski Cross men:  Daniel Bohnacker   Andreas Matt   Patrick Koller 
Ski Cross standings (after 4 of 11 races): (1) Matt 239 points (2) Nick Zoricic  194 (3) John Teller  170
Overall standings: (1) Guilbaut Colas  & Matt 48 points (3) Patrick Deneen  40
Ski Cross women:  Kelsey Serwa   Fanny Smith   Ashleigh McIvor 
Ski Cross standings (after 4 of 11 races): (1)  Heidi Zacher  260 points (2) Serwa 249 (3) Smith 247
Overall standings: (1) Hannah Kearney  56 points (2) Zacher 52 (3) Serwa 50

Snooker
Masters in London, England, Last 16:
Neil Robertson  [2] 6–3 Stephen Hendry  [10]
Shaun Murphy  [8] 3–6 Jamie Cope  [14]

January 11, 2011 (Tuesday)

Alpine skiing
Women's World Cup in Flachau, Austria:
Slalom:  Maria Riesch  & Tanja Poutiainen  1:42.52  Nastasia Noens  1:43.04
Slalom standings (after 6 of 10 races): (1) Riesch 420 points (2) Marlies Schild  & Poutiainen 400
Overall standings (after 18 of 38 races): (1) Riesch 1023 points (2) Lindsey Vonn  827 (3) Poutiainen 580

Football (soccer)
AFC Asian Cup in Qatar:
Group D:
 0–0 
 1–2

Snooker
Masters in London, England, Last 16:
Ronnie O'Sullivan  [7] 4–6 Mark Allen  [12]
Stephen Maguire  [6] 4–6 Marco Fu  [16]

January 10, 2011 (Monday)

American football
NCAA bowl games – Bowl Championship Series:
BCS National Championship Game in Glendale, Arizona:  Auburn 22, Oregon 19
Wes Byrum's 19-yard field goal as time expires gives the Tigers their first undisputed national championship.
A SEC school wins the championship for the fifth consecutive year.

Football (soccer)
AFC Asian Cup in Qatar:
Group C:
 0–4 
 2–1 
FIFA Ballon d'Or:
Lionel Messi of FC Barcelona is named player of the year, ahead of his two teammates Andrés Iniesta and Xavi.
Marta of FC Gold Pride (now defunct) and Santos is named women's world player of the year for the fifth consecutive time.
José Mourinho (Internazionale and Real Madrid) and Silvia Neid (Germany) are named men's and women's coaches of the year respectively.

Snooker
Masters in London, England, Last 16:
Mark Williams  [5] 4–6 Ding Junhui  [9]
John Higgins  [4] 4–6 Graeme Dott  [11]

January 9, 2011 (Sunday)

Alpine skiing
Men's World Cup in Adelboden, Switzerland:
Slalom:  Ivica Kostelić  1:50.90  Marcel Hirscher  1:51.16  Reinfried Herbst  1:52.19
Slalom standings (after 4 of 10 races): (1) Kostelić 253 points (2) André Myhrer  204 (3) Hirscher 196
Overall standings (after 15 of 38 races): (1) Kostelić 504 points (2) Aksel Lund Svindal  435 (3) Silvan Zurbriggen  421
Women's World Cup in Zauchensee, Austria:
Super-G:  Lara Gut  1:12.82  Lindsey Vonn  1:13.35  Dominique Gisin  1:13.54
Super G standings (after 2 of 7 races): (1) Vonn 180 points (2) Maria Riesch  120 (3) Gut 100
Overall standings (after 17 of 38 races): (1) Riesch 923 points (2) Vonn 827 (3) Elisabeth Görgl  565

American football
NFL playoffs – Wild Card Weekend:
AFC: Baltimore Ravens 30, Kansas City Chiefs 7
NFC: Green Bay Packers 21, Philadelphia Eagles 16
NCAA bowl games:
Kraft Fight Hunger Bowl in San Francisco: Nevada 20, Boston College 13

Badminton
BWF Super Series:
BWF Super Series Masters Finals in Taipei:
Men's singles: Lee Chong Wei  def. Peter Gade  21–9, 21–14
Women's singles: Wang Shixian  def. Bae Yeon-ju  21–13, 21–15
Men's doubles: Carsten Mogensen /Mathias Boe  def. Jung Jae-sung /Lee Yong-dae  21–17, 21–15
Women's doubles: Wang Xiaoli /Yu Yang  def. Cheng Shu /Zhao Yunlei  21–7, 21–17
Mixed doubles: Zhang Nan /Zhao Yunlei  def. Sudket Prapakamol /Saralee Thungthongkam  21–17, 21–12

Biathlon
World Cup 4 in Oberhof, Germany:
Men's 15 km Mass start:  Tarjei Bø  39:51.3 (0+1+0+1)  Emil Hegle Svendsen  39:53.7 (1+0+2+0)  Ivan Tcherezov  39:55.4 (0+0+1+1)
Overall standings (after 9 of 26 races): (1) Bø 449 points (2) Svendsen 394 (3) Ole Einar Bjørndalen  304
Women's 12.5 km Mass Start:  Helena Ekholm  39:22.9 (0+0+0+0)  Andrea Henkel  39:24.5 (0+1+1+0)  Svetlana Sleptsova  39:28.1 (0+0+0+0)
Overall standings (after 9 of 26 races): (1) Kaisa Mäkäräinen  425 points (2) Ekholm 381 (3) Marie-Laure Brunet  324

Cricket
Pakistan in New Zealand:
1st Test in Hamilton, day 3:  275 & 110 (38.3 overs);  367 (122.1 overs) & 21/0 (3.4 overs). Pakistan win by 10 wickets; lead 2-match series 1–0.
India in South Africa:
Only T20I in Durban:  168/6 (20 overs);  147/9 (20 overs). India win by 21 runs.

Cross-country skiing
Tour de Ski:
Stage 8 in Val di Fiemme, Italy:
Men's 9 km freestyle:  Lukáš Bauer  30:28.3  Roland Clara  31:00.7  Curdin Perl  31:02.1
Final Tour de Ski standings: (1) Dario Cologna  4:28:02.0 (2) Petter Northug  4:28:29.3 (3) Bauer 4:29:46.1
Cologna wins his second Tour de Ski in three years.
World Cup Distance standings (after 11 of 17 races): (1) Cologna 481 points (2) Alexander Legkov  406 (3) Bauer 400
World Cup Overall standings (after 18 of 31 races): (1) Cologna 1197 points (2) Northug 706 (3) Bauer 698
Women's 9 km freestyle:  Therese Johaug  33:14.4  Marte Elden  34:14.8  Marthe Kristoffersen  35:08.3
Final Tour de Ski standings: (1) Justyna Kowalczyk  2:47:31.0 (2) Johaug 2:48:52.5 (3) Marianna Longa  2:50:11.7
Kowalczyk wins her second consecutive Tour de Ski.
World Cup Distance standings (after 11 of 17 races): (1) Kowalczyk 592 points (2) Marit Bjørgen  410 (3) Charlotte Kalla  371
World Cup Overall standings (after 18 of 31 races): (1) Kowalczyk 1271 points (2) Arianna Follis  864 (3) Bjørgen 760

Darts
BDO World Championship in Frimley Green, England:
Men's final: Martin Adams  7–5 Dean Winstanley 
Adams wins the title for the third time, and becomes the third player to successfully defend his title, after Eric Bristow  and Raymond van Barneveld .

Football (soccer)
AFC Asian Cup in Qatar:
Group B:
 1–1 
 1–2

Golf
PGA Tour:
Hyundai Tournament of Champions in Kapalua, Hawaii:
Winner: Jonathan Byrd  268 (−24)PO
In the tour's season opener, Byrd defeats Robert Garrigus  on the second playoff hole to claim his fifth PGA Tour title.
European Tour:
Africa Open in Port Alfred, Eastern Cape, South Africa:
Winner: Louis Oosthuizen  276 (−16)PO
Oosthuizen defeats Chris Wood  and Manuel Quirós  on the first playoff hole to win his third European Tour title.
Other events:
Royal Trophy in Cha-am/Hua Hin, Thailand:
Team Europe 9–7 Team Asia
Team Europe collects its second consecutive win in this event, and fourth in the five editions to date.

Nordic combined
World Cup in Schonach, Germany:
HS 106 / 4 x 5 km: Cancelled due to bad weather.

Ski jumping
World Cup in Harrachov, Czech Republic:
HS 205 (Ski flying):  Thomas Morgenstern  414.5 points  Simon Ammann  404.4  Roman Koudelka  401.2
Ski Flying standings (after 2 of 7 events): (1) Morgenstern 180 points (2) Martin Koch  129 (3) Ammann 120
World Cup standings (after 13 of 26 events): (1) Morgenstern 1083 points (2) Ammann 681 (3) Andreas Kofler  621

Snooker
Masters in London, England, Last 16:
Mark Selby  [1] 4–6 Mark King  [15]
Ali Carter  [3] 5–6 Peter Ebdon  [13]

Snowboarding
World Cup in Bad Gastein, Austria:
Men's Parallel Slalom:  Benjamin Karl   Aaron March   Simon Schoch 
Parallel Slalom standings (after 5 of 10 races): (1) Karl 2910 points (2) Andreas Prommegger  2900 (3) Roland Fischnaller  2760
Overall standings: (1) Karl 2910 points (2) Prommegger 2900 (3) Fischnaller 2760
Women's Parallel Slalom:  Yekaterina Tudegesheva   Marion Kreiner   Claudia Riegler 
Parallel Slalom standings (after 5 of 10 races): (1) Tudegesheva 3890 points (2) Fränzi Mägert-Kohli  3110 (3) Alena Zavarzina  2168
Overall standings: (1) Tudegesheva 3890 points (2) Mägert-Kohli 3110 (3) Dominique Maltais  3000

Speed skating
European Championships in Collalbo, Italy:
Men:  Ivan Skobrev  154.167  Jan Blokhuijsen  154.273  Koen Verweij  154.688
Skobrev wins the title for the first time.
Women:  Martina Sáblíková  165.104  Ireen Wüst  166.463  Marrit Leenstra  168.045
Sáblíková wins the title for the third time.

Tennis
ATP World Tour:
Brisbane International:
Final: Robin Söderling  def. Andy Roddick  6–3, 7–5
Soderling wins the 7th title of his career.
Aircel Chennai Open:
Final: Stanislas Wawrinka  def. Xavier Malisse  7–5, 4–6, 6–1
Wawrinka wins the 3rd title of his career.

January 8, 2011 (Saturday)

Alpine skiing
Men's World Cup in Adelboden, Switzerland:
Giant slalom:  Cyprien Richard  2:25.28  Aksel Lund Svindal  2:25.28  Thomas Fanara  2:25.48
Giant slalom standings (after 4 of 7 races): (1) Ted Ligety  303 points (2) Svindal 265 (3) Richard 242
Overall standings (after 14 of 38 races): (1) Svindal 435 points (2) Michael Walchhofer  409 (3) Ivica Kostelić  404
Women's World Cup in Zauchensee, Austria:
Downhill:  Lindsey Vonn  1:46.39  Anja Pärson  1:46.82  Anna Fenninger  1:47.37
Downhill standings (after 4 of 9 races): (1) Vonn 360 points (2) Maria Riesch  257 (3) Elisabeth Görgl  187
Overall standings (after 16 of 38 races): (1) Riesch 883 points (2) Vonn 747 (3) Görgl 515

American football
NFL playoffs – Wild Card Weekend:
NFC: Seattle Seahawks 41, New Orleans Saints 36
The Saints become the first reigning Super Bowl champions since the St. Louis Rams in the 2000–01 playoffs to lose in the Wild Card round, thus a new champion will be crowned for the sixth straight year (the New England Patriots remain the last repeat Super Bowl champions).
The Seahawks become the first team with a losing record to win a playoff game.
AFC: New York Jets 17, Indianapolis Colts 16
NCAA bowl games:
BBVA Compass Bowl in Birmingham, Alabama: Pittsburgh 27, Kentucky 10

Biathlon
World Cup 4 in Oberhof, Germany:
Women's 7.5 km Sprint:  Ann Kristin Flatland  23:29.5 (1+0)  Magdalena Neuner  23:35.2 (1+1)  Andrea Henkel  23:44.7 (0+1)
Standings (after 4 of 10 events): (1) Kaisa Mäkäräinen  196 points (2) Darya Domracheva  165 (3) Neuner 150
Overall standings (after 8 of 26 events): (1) Mäkäräinen 394 points (2) Helena Ekholm  321 (3) Anna Carin Zidek  291

Cricket
Pakistan in New Zealand:
1st Test in Hamilton, day 2:  275 (97.5 overs);  235/4 (80 overs). Pakistan trail by 40 runs with 6 wickets remaining in the 1st innings.

Cross-country skiing
Tour de Ski:
Stage 7 in Val di Fiemme, Italy:
Men's 20 km classical:  Petter Northug  57:17.2  Dario Cologna  57:19.0  Devon Kershaw  57:19.4
Tour de Ski standings (after 7 of 8 races): (1) Cologna 3:56:03.9 (2) Northug 3:57:22.0 (3) Martin Jakš  3:58:50.4
World Cup Distance standings (after 10 of 17 races): (1) Cologna 468 points (2) Alexander Legkov  406 (3) Lukáš Bauer  350
World Cup Overall standings (after 16 of 31 races): (1) Cologna 784 points (2) Legkov 651 (3) Marcus Hellner  513
Women's 10 km classical:  Justyna Kowalczyk  30:27.6  Therese Johaug  30:33.9  Marianna Longa  31:23.3
Tour de Ski standings (after 7 of 8 races): (1) Kowalczyk 2:12:17.3 (2) Longa 2:14:25.6 (3) Arianna Follis  2:14:50.3
World Cup Distance standings (after 10 of 17 races): (1) Kowalczyk 552 points (2) Marit Bjørgen  410 (3) Charlotte Kalla  349
World Cup Overall standings (after 16 of 31 races): (1) Kowalczyk 831 points (2) Bjørgen 760 (3) Follis 640

Football (soccer)
AFC Asian Cup in Qatar:
Group A:  0–2

Ice hockey
World Women's U18 Championship in Stockholm, Sweden:
Relegation round (best-of-3 series):
Game 3:  5–1 . Switzerland win the series 2–1 and send Japan to Division I in 2012.
Bronze medal game:  0–3  
Final:   5–2  
The United States win the championship for the third time.
MLP Nations Cup in Kreuzlingen, Switzerland:
5th Place Game:  2–3 (SO) 
Bronze Medal Game:  2–7  
Final:   0–6  
Canada win the Cup for the 8th time in 9 years.

Nordic combined
World Cup in Schonach, Germany:
HS 106 / 10 km:  Felix Gottwald  24:38.4  Mario Stecher  24:54.0  Bernhard Gruber  24:54.6
Overall standings (after 7 of 13 races): (1) Stecher 466 points (2) Jason Lamy-Chappuis  459 (3) Mikko Kokslien  387

Ski jumping
World Cup in Harrachov, Czech Republic:
HS 205 (Ski flying):  Martin Koch  425.2 points  Thomas Morgenstern  421.9  Adam Małysz  416.6
World Cup standings (after 12 of 26 events): (1) Morgenstern 983 points (2) Andreas Kofler  621 (3) Simon Ammann  601

Tennis
ATP World Tour:
Qatar ExxonMobil Open:
Final: Roger Federer  def. Nikolay Davydenko  6–3, 6–4
Federer wins the tournament for the third time and the 67th title of his career.
WTA Tour:
Brisbane International:
Final: Petra Kvitová  def. Andrea Petkovic  6–1, 6–3
Kvitová wins the second title of her career.
ASB Classic:
Final: Gréta Arn  def. Yanina Wickmayer  6–3, 6–3
Arn wins the second title of her career.
Hopman Cup:
Final: United States  2–1 
Justine Henin  def. Bethanie Mattek-Sands  7–6(6), 6–3
John Isner  def. Ruben Bemelmans  6–3, 6–4
Mattek-Sands/Isner  def. Henin/Bemelmans  6–1, 6–3
The United States win the Cup for a record sixth time.
Hong Kong Tennis Classic in Hong Kong:
Gold Group Final: Team Russia 3–1 Team Europe
Russia win the title for the second straight time.

January 7, 2011 (Friday)

American football
NFL news:
The San Francisco 49ers name Jim Harbaugh their new head coach, signing the former Stanford coach to a 5-year, $25 million contract.
NCAA bowl games:
Cotton Bowl in Arlington, Texas: LSU 41, Texas A&M 24
Division I FCS:
NCAA Division I Football Championship Game in Frisco, Texas (seeds in parentheses): (5) Eastern Washington 20, (3) Delaware 19
The Eagles win the Championship for the first time.

Biathlon
World Cup 4 in Oberhof, Germany:
Men's 10 km Sprint:  Tarjei Bø  25:49.7 (0+1)  Arnd Peiffer  26:06.4 (0+1)  Michal Šlesingr  26:10.4 (0+0)
Sprint standings (after 4 of 10 races): (1) Bø 214 points (2) Emil Hegle Svendsen  161 (3) Ole Einar Bjørndalen  & Lukas Hofer  134
Overall standings (after 8 of 26 races): (1) Bø 389 points (2) Svendsen 340 (3) Bjørndalen 284

Cricket
England in Australia:
Ashes series:
Fifth Test in Sydney, day 5:  280 & 281 (84.4 overs);  644. England win by an innings & 83 runs; win 5-match series 3–1.
Pakistan in New Zealand:
1st Test in Hamilton, day 1:  260/7 (90 overs); .

Darts
BDO World Championship in Frimley Green, England:
Women's final: Trina Gulliver  2–0 Rhian Edwards 
Gulliver repeats her 2010 final victory over Edwards, and wins her ninth world title.

Football (soccer)
AFC Asian Cup in Qatar:
Group A:  0–2

Freestyle skiing
World Cup in St. Johann in Tirol, Austria:
Men's Ski Cross:  John Teller   Nick Zoricic   Thomas Zangerl 
Ski Cross standings (after 3 of 11 races): (1) Teller 170 points (2) Zoricic 162 (3) Andreas Matt  159
Overall standings: (1) Guilbaut Colas  48 points (2) Patrick Deneen  40 (3) Mikaël Kingsbury  39
Women's Ski Cross:  Heidi Zacher   Hedda Berntsen   Anna Wörner 
Ski Cross standings (after 3 of 11 races): (1) Zacher 210 points (2) Fanny Smith  167 (3) Anna Holmlund  150
Overall standings: (1) Hannah Kearney  56 points (2) Zacher 42 (3) Jennifer Heil  40

Ice hockey
World Women's U18 Championship in Stockholm, Sweden:
Relegation round (best-of-3 series):
Game 2:  5–1 . Series tied 1–1.
5th place game:  0–2 
Semifinals:
 6–1 
 14–1 
MLP Nations Cup in Kreuzlingen, Switzerland:
Semifinals:
 9–0 
 3–1

January 6, 2011 (Thursday)

Alpine skiing
Men's World Cup in Zagreb, Croatia:
Slalom:  André Myhrer  1:52.74  Ivica Kostelić  1:52.84  Mattias Hargin  1:53.10
Slalom standings (after 3 of 10 races): (1) Myhrer 189 points (2) Kostelić 153 (3) Jean-Baptiste Grange  122
Overall standings (after 13 of 38 races): (1) Michael Walchhofer  409 points (2) Silvan Zurbriggen  396 (3) Ted Ligety  376

American football
NCAA bowl games:
GoDaddy.com Bowl in Mobile, Alabama: Miami (OH) 35, Middle Tennessee 21
The RedHawks, 1–11 last season, become the first team in FBS history to follow a 10-loss season with a 10-win season.

Biathlon
World Cup 4 in Oberhof, Germany:
Women's 4 x 6 km Relay:   (Jenny Jonsson/Anna Carin Olofsson-Zidek/Anna Maria Nilsson/Helena Ekholm) 1:17:53.1 (1+8)   (Anais Bescond/Marie Dorin/Pauline Macabies/Marie-Laure Brunet) 1:18:45.4 (3+9)   (Nadezhda Skardino/Darya Domracheva/Nadzeya Pisareva/Liudmila Kalinchik) 1:19:24.5 (1+13)
Standings (after 2 of 4 events): (1)  & Sweden 98 points (3)  97

Cricket
England in Australia:
Ashes series:
Fifth Test in Sydney, day 4:  280 & 213/7 (67 overs);  644 (178 overs; Matt Prior 118). Australia trail by 151 runs with 3 wickets remaining.
India in South Africa:
3rd Test in Cape Town, day 5:  362 & 341;  364 & 166/3 (82 overs). Match drawn; 3-match series drawn 1–1.

Cross-country skiing
Tour de Ski:
Stage 6: Cortina d'Ampezzo–Toblach, Italy:
Men's 35 km freestyle pursuit:  Dario Cologna  1:20:06.9  Marcus Hellner  1:21:13.2  Petter Northug  1:21:46.8
Tour de Ski standings (after 6 of 8 races): (1) Cologna 2:59:44.9 (2) Hellner 3:00:56.2 (3) Northug 3:01:34.8
World Cup Distance standings (after 9 of 17 races): (1) Cologna 422 points (2) Alexander Legkov  406 (3) Lukáš Bauer  330
World Cup Overall standings (after 15 of 31 races): (1) Cologna 738 points (2) Legkov 651 (3) Hellner 505
Women's 16 km freestyle pursuit:  Justyna Kowalczyk  37:41.7  Arianna Follis  38:03.9  Marianna Longa  38:04.3
Tour de Ski standings (after 6 of 8 races): (1) Kowalczyk 1:42:34.7 (2) Follis 1:43:01.9 (3) Longa 1:43:07.3
World Cup Distance standings (after 9 of 17 races): (1) Kowalczyk 502 points (2) Marit Bjørgen  410 (3) Charlotte Kalla  333
World Cup Overall standings (after 15 of 31 races): (1) Kowalczyk 781 points (2) Bjørgen 760 (3) Follis 606

Ice hockey
MLP Nations Cup in Kreuzlingen, Switzerland: (teams in bold advance to the semifinals)
Group A:  6–2 
Final standings: Sweden 4 points, Russia 3,  2.
Group B:  0–9 
Final standings: Canada 6 points, Germany 2,  1.

Luge
World Cup in Königssee, Germany:
Men's singles:  Armin Zöggeler  1:41.259 (50.494 / 50.765)  Albert Demtschenko  1:41.616 (50.848 / 50.768)  Reinhold Rainer  1:41.668 (50.718 / 50.950)
Standings (after 5 of 9 events): (1) Zöggeler 470 points (2) Felix Loch  345 (3) David Möller  324
Zöggeler wins his fourth successive race.
Team relay:   (Natalie Geisenberger/Jan-Armin Eichhorn/Tobias Arlt/Tobias Wendl) 2:45.971 (53.646 / 56.147 / 56.178)   (Nina Reithmayer/Daniel Pfister/Andreas Linger/Wolfgang Linger) 2:46.179 (54.100 / 56.109 / 55.970)   (Sandra Gasparini/Armin Zöggeler/Christian Oberstolz/Patrick Gruber) 2:46.520 (54.604 / 55.882 / 56.034)
Standings (after 3 of 6 events): (1) Germany 300 points (2) Italy 225 (3) Austria 201

Ski jumping
Four Hills Tournament:
Stage 4 in Bischofshofen, Austria:
HS 140:  Tom Hilde  278.7 points  Thomas Morgenstern  277.1  Andreas Kofler  275.3
Final tournament standings: (1) Morgenstern 958.8 points (2) Simon Ammann  928.4 (3) Hilde 895.0
World Cup standings (after 11 of 26 events): (1) Morgenstern 903 points (2) Kofler 621 (3) Ammann 561
Morgenstern wins the tournament for the first time.

Snooker
Championship League Group 2:
Final: Mark Williams  3–2 Ronnie O'Sullivan 
Williams advances to the winners group.

January 5, 2011 (Wednesday)

Baseball
Major League Baseball news:
Roberto Alomar and Bert Blyleven are elected to the Hall of Fame by the Baseball Writers' Association of America. They will be inducted on July 24, alongside Pat Gillick, who was elected in Veterans Committee balloting in December 2010.

Biathlon
World Cup 4 in Oberhof, Germany:
Men's 4 x 7.5 km Relay:   (Christoph Stephan, Alexander Wolf, Arnd Peiffer, Michael Greis) 1:23:53.0 (2+16)   (Zdeněk Vítek, Jaroslav Soukup, Ondřej Moravec, Michal Šlesingr) 1:26:15.8 (3+14)   (Alexander Os, Lars Berger, Rune Brattsveen, Ole Einar Bjørndalen) 1:26:17.0 (6+14)
Standings (after 2 of 4 events): (1) Norway 108 points (2) Germany 103 (3) Czech Republic 90

Cricket
England in Australia:
Ashes series:
Fifth Test in Sydney, day 3:  280;  488/7 (141 overs; Alastair Cook 189, Ian Bell 115). England lead by 208 runs with 3 wickets remaining in the 1st innings.
India in South Africa:
3rd Test in Cape Town, day 4:  362 & 341 (102 overs; Jacques Kallis 109*, Harbhajan Singh 7/120);  364. South Africa lead by 339 runs.

Cross-country skiing
Tour de Ski:
Stage 5 in Toblach, Italy:
Men's sprint freestyle:  Devon Kershaw  2:58.0  Dario Cologna  2:58.1  Petter Northug  2:59.2
Tour de Ski standings (after 5 of 8 races): (1) Cologna 1:39:53.0 (2) Kershaw 1:40:35.8 (3) Marcus Hellner  1:41:07.1
World Cup Sprint standings (after 5 of 11 races): (1) Emil Jönsson  280 points (2) Alexei Petukhov  173 (3) Fulvio Scola  162
World Cup Overall standings (after 14 of 31 races): (1) Cologna 688 points (2) Alexander Legkov  651 (3) Hellner 459
Women's sprint freestyle:  Petra Majdič  3:17.5  Arianna Follis  3:17.6  Magda Genuin  3:18.0
Tour de Ski standings (after 5 of 8 races): (1) Justyna Kowalczyk  1:05:08.0 (2) Majdič 1:05:47.1 (3) Charlotte Kalla  1:06:16.8
World Cup Sprint standings (after 5 of 11 races): (1) Follis 272 points (2) Majdič 204 (3) Kikkan Randall  191
World Cup Overall standings (after 14 of 31 races): (1) Marit Bjørgen  760 points (2) Kowalczyk 731 (3) Follis 560

Football (soccer)
News: Kristine Lilly, whose 352 appearances with the US women's national team make her the most-capped player in the sport's history, announces her retirement after an international career of over 20 years.

Ice hockey
World Junior Championships in Buffalo, United States:
Bronze medal game:  2–4  
Final:   5–3  
Russia overturn a three-goal deficit in the third period, to win the Championships for the fourth time.
World Women's U18 Championship in Stockholm, Sweden:
Relegation round (best-of-3 series):
Game 1:  4–0 . Switzerland lead series 1–0.
Quarterfinals:
 1–3 
 2–3 (OT) 
MLP Nations Cup in Kreuzlingen, Switzerland: (teams in bold advance to the semifinals)
Group A:  2–0 
Standings: Russia 3 points (1 game), Finland 2 (2),  1 (1).
Group B:  4–5 (OT) 
Standings:  3 points (1 game), Germany 2 (1), Switzerland 1 (2).

Luge
World Cup in Königssee, Germany:
Doubles:  Tobias Wendl/Tobias Arlt  1:41.362 (50.678 / 50.684)  Christian Oberstolz/Patrick Gruber  1:41.448 (50.720 / 50.728)  Andreas Linger/Wolfgang Linger  1:41.607 (50.863 / 50.744)
Standings (after 5 of 9 events): (1) Wendl 430 points (2) Oberstolz 400 (3) Linger 346
Women's singles:  Natalie Geisenberger  1:41.756 (50.896 / 50.860)  Tatjana Hüfner  1:41.776 (50.978 / 50.798)  Alex Gough  1:42.215 (51.065 / 51.150)
Standings (after 5 of 9 events): (1) Hüfner 485 points (2) Geisenberger 390 (3) Anke Wischnewski  345

January 4, 2011 (Tuesday)

Alpine skiing
Women's World Cup in Zagreb, Croatia:
Slalom:  Marlies Schild  2:01.80  Maria Riesch  2:02.55  Manuela Mölgg  2:02.88
Slalom standings (after 5 of 10 races): (1) Schild 400 points (2) Riesch 320 (3) Tanja Poutiainen  300
Overall standings (after 15 of 38 races): (1) Riesch 833 points (2) Lindsey Vonn  647 (3) Elisabeth Görgl  483

American football
NFL news:
The Oakland Raiders announce that they will not renew the contract of head coach Tom Cable for next season.
NCAA bowl games – Bowl Championship Series:
Sugar Bowl in New Orleans: Ohio State 31, Arkansas 26

Cricket
England in Australia:
Ashes series:
Fifth Test in Sydney, day 2:  280 (106.1 overs);  167/3 (48 overs). England trail by 113 runs with 7 wickets remaining in the 1st innings.
India in South Africa:
3rd Test in Cape Town, day 3:  362 & 52/2 (16 overs);  364 (117.4 overs; Sachin Tendulkar 146, Dale Steyn 5/75). South Africa lead by 50 runs with 8 wickets remaining.

Ice hockey
World Junior Championships in the United States:
Relegation round in Lewiston: (teams in strike are relegated to Division I in 2012)
 1–3 
 2–5 
Final standings: Czech Republic 9 points, Slovakia 5, Norway 3, Germany 1.
5th place playoff in Buffalo:  2–3 (SO) 
World Women's U18 Championship in Stockholm, Sweden: (teams in bold advance to the semifinals, team in italic advance to the quarterfinals)
Group A:
 1–4 
 8–1 
Final standings: Canada 9 points, Germany 6, Finland 3, Switzerland 0.
Group B:
 4–1 
 9–0 
Final standings: United States 9 points, Sweden 6, Czech Republic 3, Japan 0.
MLP Nations Cup in Kreuzlingen, Switzerland:
Group A:  4–3 (SO) 
Group B:  5–0

Snooker
Championship League Group 1:
Final: Mark Selby  3–2 Ali Carter 
Selby advances to the winners group.

January 3, 2011 (Monday)

American football
NFL news:
The Cleveland Browns fire head coach Eric Mangini after the franchise's second successive 5–11 season.
NCAA bowl games – Bowl Championship Series:
Orange Bowl in Miami Gardens, Florida: Stanford 40, Virginia Tech 12

Cricket
England in Australia:
Ashes series:
Fifth Test in Sydney, day 1:  134/4 (59 overs); .
India in South Africa:
3rd Test in Cape Town, day 2:  362 (112.5 overs; Jacques Kallis 161, Sreesanth 5/114);  142/2 (50 overs). India trail by 220 runs with 8 wickets remaining in the 1st innings.

Cross-country skiing
Tour de Ski:
Stage 4 in Oberstdorf, Germany:
Men's 10+10 km pursuit:  Matti Heikkinen  49:20.1  Dario Cologna  49:21.1  Martin Jakš  49:25.0
Tour de Ski standings (after 4 of 8 races): (1) Cologna 1:37:51.0 (2) Devon Kershaw  1:38:36.9 (3) Marcus Hellner  1:38:57.1
World Cup Distance standings (after 8 of 17 races): (1) Alexander Legkov  406 points (2) Cologna 372 (3) Lukáš Bauer  310
World Cup Overall standings (after 13 of 31 races): (1) Cologna 642 points (2) Legkov 640 (3) Hellner 419
Women's 5+5 km pursuit:  Anna Haag  26:59.8  Charlotte Kalla  27:00.4  Marthe Kristoffersen  27:07.0
Tour de Ski standings (after 4 of 8 races): (1) Justyna Kowalczyk  1:01:52.3 (2) Kalla 1:03:12.1 (3) Marianna Longa  1:03:14.4
World Cup Distance standings (after 8 of 17 races): (1) Kowalczyk 452 points (2) Marit Bjørgen  410 (3) Kalla 293
World Cup Overall standings (after 13 of 31 races): (1) Bjørgen 760 points (2) Kowalczyk 722 (3) Arianna Follis  514

Darts
PDC World Championship in London:
Final: Adrian Lewis  7–5 Gary Anderson 
Lewis becomes the fifth player to win the PDC world title and the first player to hit a nine-dart finish in the final of a World Championship, recording the perfect leg in the third leg of the first set.

Ice hockey
World Junior Championships in Buffalo, United States:
Semi-finals:
 3–4 (SO) 
 1–4 
For the first time since the format change in 2003 both bye teams are eliminated in the semifinals.
Canada qualifies for its 10th consecutive final.

Ski jumping
Four Hills Tournament:
Stage 3 in Innsbruck, Austria:
HS 130:  Thomas Morgenstern  266.5 points  Adam Małysz  257.5  Tom Hilde  255.2
Tournament standings (after 3 of 4 events): (1) Morgenstern 681.7 points (2) Simon Ammann  654.4 (3) Małysz 638.8
World Cup standings (after 10 of 26 events): (1) Morgenstern 823 points (2) Andreas Kofler  561 (3) Ammann 511
Morgenstern gets his second win of the tournament and the sixth of the season.

January 2, 2011 (Sunday)

Alpine skiing
Men's World Cup in Munich, Germany:
Parallel slalom:  Ivica Kostelić   Julien Lizeroux   Bode Miller 
Overall standings (after 12 of 38 races): (1) Michael Walchhofer  409 points (2) Silvan Zurbriggen  395 (3) Ted Ligety  336
Women's World Cup in Munich, Germany:
Parallel slalom:  Maria Pietilä Holmner   Tina Maze   Elisabeth Görgl 
Overall standings (after 14 of 38 races): (1) Maria Riesch  753 points (2) Lindsey Vonn  647 (3) Görgl 483

American football
NFL Week 17 (division champions in bold; wild cards in italics):
Atlanta Falcons 31, Carolina Panthers 10
As well as sealing the NFC South, the Falcons clinch the #1 seeding for the NFC playoffs.
Pittsburgh Steelers 41, Cleveland Browns 9
Detroit Lions 20, Minnesota Vikings 13
Oakland Raiders 31, Kansas City Chiefs 10
New England Patriots 38, Miami Dolphins 7
Tampa Bay Buccaneers 23, New Orleans Saints 13
New York Jets 38, Buffalo Bills 7
Baltimore Ravens 13, Cincinnati Bengals 7
Houston Texans 34, Jacksonville Jaguars 17
New York Giants 17, Washington Redskins 14
Dallas Cowboys 14, Philadelphia Eagles 13
San Francisco 49ers 38, Arizona Cardinals 7
Green Bay Packers 10, Chicago Bears 3
Indianapolis Colts 23, Tennessee Titans 20
San Diego Chargers 33, Denver Broncos 28
Sunday Night Football: Seattle Seahawks 16, St. Louis Rams 6
The Seahawks win the NFC West title, and become the first team to win its division with a losing record.

Cricket
India in South Africa:
3rd Test in Cape Town, day 1:  232/4 (74 overs); .

Cross-country skiing
Tour de Ski:
Stage 3 in Oberstdorf, Germany:
Men's Sprint Classic:  Emil Jönsson   Devon Kershaw   Dario Cologna 
Tour de Ski standings (after 3 of 8 races): (1) Cologna 49:09.9 (2) Kershaw 49:13.6 (3) Alexander Legkov  49:33.0
World Cup Sprint standings (after 4 of 11 races): (1) Jönsson 280 points (2) Alexei Petukhov  173 (3) Fulvio Scola  153
World Cup Overall standings (after 12 of 31 races): (1) Legkov 610 points (2) Cologna 596 (3) Marcus Hellner  393
Women's Sprint Classic:  Petra Majdič   Justyna Kowalczyk   Astrid Uhrenholdt Jacobsen 
Tour de Ski standings (after 3 of 8 races): (1) Kowalczyk 35:13.8 (2) Majdič 35:58.2 (3) Aino-Kaisa Saarinen  36:14.1
World Cup Sprint standings (after 4 of 11 races): (1) Arianna Follis  226 points (2) Majdič & Kikkan Randall  154
World Cup Overall standings (after 12 of 31 races): (1) Marit Bjørgen  760 points (2) Kowalczyk 685 (3) Follis 474

Ice hockey
World Junior Championships in the United States:
Relegation round in Lewiston: (teams in strike are relegated to Division I in 2012)
 5–0 
 3–2 
Standings (after 2 games): Czech Republic 6 points, Slovakia 5, Germany 1, Norway 0.
Quarter-finals in Buffalo:
 4–1 
 3–4 (OT) 
World Women's U18 Championship in Stockholm, Sweden: (teams in italic advance to the final round)
Group A:
 4–2 
 0–6 
Standings (after 2 games): Canada, Germany 6 points, Finland, Switzerland 0.
Group B:
 1–7 
 3–2 
Standings (after 2 games): United States, Sweden 6 points, Japan, Czech Republic 0.

January 1, 2011 (Saturday)

American football
NCAA bowl games:
Bowl Championship Series:
Rose Bowl in Pasadena, California: TCU 21, Wisconsin 19
Fiesta Bowl in Glendale, Arizona: Oklahoma 48, Connecticut 20
Other games:
TicketCity Bowl in Dallas: Texas Tech 45, Northwestern 38
Capital One Bowl in Orlando, Florida: Alabama 49, Michigan State 7
Gator Bowl in Jacksonville, Florida: Mississippi State 52, Michigan 14
Outback Bowl in Tampa, Florida: Florida 37, Penn State 24

Cross-country skiing
Tour de Ski:
Stage 2 in Oberhof, Germany:
Men's 15 km Classic Pursuit:  Dario Cologna  47:48.1  Devon Kershaw  47:48.6  Alexander Legkov  47:48.9
Tour de Ski standings (after 2 of 8 races): (1) Cologna 47:33.1 (2) Kershaw 47:38.6 (3) Legkov 47:43.9
World Cup Distance standings (after 7 of 17 races): (1) Legkov 376 points (2) Cologna 326 (3) Lukáš Bauer  273
World Cup Overall standings (after 11 of 31 races): (1) Legkov 576 points (2) Cologna 553 (3) Marcus Hellner  363
Women's 10 km Classic Pursuit:  Justyna Kowalczyk  33:32.5  Krista Lähteenmäki  34:00.0  Marianna Longa  34:03.0
Tour de Ski standings (after 2 of 8 races): (1) Kowalczyk 33:17.5 (2) Lähteenmäki 33:50.0 (3) Longa 33:58.0
World Cup Distance standings (after 7 of 17 races): (1) Kowalczyk 415 points (2) Marit Bjørgen  410 (3) Charlotte Kalla  247
World Cup Overall standings (after 11 of 31 races): (1) Bjørgen 760 points (2) Kowalczyk 639 (3) Arianna Follis  458

Football (soccer)
 Emperor's Cup Final in Tokyo:
Kashima Antlers 2–1 Shimizu S-Pulse
Kashima Antlers win the Cup for the fourth time.

Ice hockey
World Women's U18 Championship in Stockholm, Sweden:
Group A:
 9–1 
 1–0 
Group B:
 11–0 
 2–1 
NHL Winter Classic in Pittsburgh: Washington Capitals 3, Pittsburgh Penguins 1

Mixed martial arts
UFC 125 in Las Vegas, United States:
Lightweight bout: Clay Guida  def. Takanori Gomi  by submission (guillotine choke)
Welterweight bout: Dong Hyun Kim  def. Nate Diaz  by unanimous decision (29–28, 29–28, 29–28)
Light Heavyweight bout: Thiago Silva  def. Brandon Vera  by unanimous decision (30–26, 30–27, 30–27)
Middleweight bout: Brian Stann  def. Chris Leben  by TKO (strikes)
Lightweight Championship bout: Frankie Edgar  (c) and Gray Maynard  fought to a split draw (48–46, 46–48, 47–47).

Ski jumping
Four Hills Tournament:
Stage 2 in Garmisch-Partenkirchen, Germany:
HS 140:  Simon Ammann  142.1 points  Pavel Karelin  138.3  Adam Małysz  138.0
Tournament standings (after 2 of 4 events): (1) Thomas Morgenstern  415.2 points (2) Ammann 401.7 (3) Matti Hautamäki  388.7
World Cup standings (after 9 of 26 events): (1) Morgenstern 723 points (2) Andreas Kofler  525 (3) Ammann 461

Tennis
Mubadala World Tennis Championship:
Final: Rafael Nadal  def. Roger Federer  7–6(4), 7–6(3)
Nadal wins the tournament for the second successive year.

References

1